= BI 99179 =

Names
- IUPAC name (1R,3S)-N-[4-(1,3-Benzoxazol-2-yl)phenyl]-N-methyl-3-(propanoylamino)cyclopentane-1-carboxamide

Identifiers
CAS Number	1291779-76-4
3D model (JSmol)	Interactive image
ChEMBL	ChEMBL1834184
ChemSpider	26616821
PubChem CID	51346964
UNII	S2JB42BBP5
CompTox Dashboard (EPA)	DTXSID201336351
- InChI: InChI=1S/C23H25N3O3/c1-3-21(27)24-17-11-8-16(14-17)23(28)26(2)18-12-9-15(10-13-18)22-25-19-6-4-5-7-20(19)29-22/h4-7,9-10,12-13,16-17H,3,8,11,14H2,1-2H3,(H,24,27)/t16-,17+/m1/s1 Key: YNFDIGJKJPNFFD-SJORKVTESA-N
- SMILES: CCC(=O)N[C@H]1CC[C@H](C1)C(=O)N(C)C2=CC=C(C=C2)C3=NC4=CC=CC=C4O3

Properties
Chemical formula	C_{23}H_{25}N_{3}O_{3}
Molar mass	391.471 g·mol^{−1}

Pharmacology
- Pharmacokinetics
Bioavailability	46%
Protein binding	97.6% (rat)
- Except where otherwise noted, data are given for materials in their standard state (at 25 °C [77 °F], 100 kPa). Infobox references

BI 99179 is a selective small molecule inhibitor suitable for the in vivo validation of type 1 fatty acid synthase (FAS) as a therapeutic target for lipid metabolism-related disorders (lipid metabolism disorder) which has been discovered by Boehringer Ingelheim.

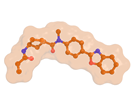
3D model of BI 99179

== Summary ==
BI 99179 is characterized by its high potency, high selectivity, and significant exposure (both peripheral and central) upon oral administration in rats.

== Target information ==
Mammalian type I FAS is a multi-enzyme protein that catalyzes fatty acid synthesis. It mediates key roles in neoplastic lipogenesis and is highly expressed in lipogenic tissues. While most tissues, except liver and adipose tissue, have low levels of FAS expression and activity, FAS is over-expressed in many cancers. Accumulating evidence suggests that it is a metabolic oncogene with an important role in tumor growth and survival, thus making it an attractive target for cancer therapy. In addition to its role in oncology, FAS inhibition could also represent an attractive therapeutic target in obesity; both systemic and intracerebroventricular treatment of mice with FAS inhibitors led to inhibition of feeding and dramatic weight loss. Moreover, inhibitors of FAS have been reported to reduce the production of sebum in sebocytes; therefore, topical FAS inhibition could be a potential anti-acne approach.

FAS consists of two identical subunits, each comprising an acyl carrier protein (ACP) domain and six different catalytic domains. BI 99179 is likely to bind to the ketoacyl reductase (KR) domain (evidence: Boehringer Ingelheim enzymatic data and analogy to the published co-crystal structure of the human KR domain with GSK2194069).

== In vitro activity ==
BI 99179 inhibits the FAS enzyme isolated from HeLa cells with a half maximal inhibitory concentration (IC_{50}) of 79 nM.

In Vitro Activity
Probe name	BI 99179
Inhibition of FASN* (IC_{50}) [nM]	79
Inhibition of [^{14}C]acetate incorporation^{§} mouse N-42 cells (IC_{50}) [nM]	570
Inhibition of [^{14}C]acetate incorporation^{§} hum. H1975 cells (IC_{50}) [nM]	180
Cytotoxicity (LDH release from U937 cells) (IC_{50}) [nM]	>30000
*Human FAS enzyme isolated from HeLa cells.^{§}Cells incubated with compound for 1 hour, ^{14}C-acetate in Krebs–Ringer buffer incubation for 4 hours, methanol:CHCl_{3} 1:1 extraction, measurement in β-counter. FASN, fatty acid synthase; LDH, lactate dehydrogenase.

In Vitro DMPK and CMC
Probe name	BI 99179
Aqueous solubility @ pH 7 [μg/ml]	>39
CACO permeability @pH7.4 [*10–6 cm/s]	94
CACO efflux ratio	0.9
Microsomal stability – rat, human [% QH]	<27
Plasma protein binding rat [% QH]	97.6

== In vivo DMPK ==
In Vivo DMPK Parameters
Probe name	BI 99179
t_{½} (h)	3.0
t_{max} (h)	0.5
C_{max} (nM)	2110
AUC_{0–inf} (nMh)	9350
F (%)	46
CL (ml/min/kg)	8.2
V_{ss} (l/kg)	1.6
C_{brain,2h} (nM)	1300
C_{CSF,2h} (nM)	50
Pharmacokinetic parameters of BI 99179 in male Wistar Hannover rats. *Fasted upon oral application of 4 mg/kg.

== In vivo pharmacology ==
BI 99179 showed acute efficacy in rat models.

- Increased hypothalamic Malonyl-CoA concentrations (10 or 100 mg/kg); 2 hours/24 hours post dose (p.d.)
- Decreased cumulative food intake 100 mg/kg; 24 hours p.d.

== Selectivity ==
A screen covering 30 targets was reported: <20% inhibition at 10 μM for all targets.
