= Crotonoyl-(acyl-carrier-protein) hydratase =

crotonoyl-[acyl-carrier-protein] hydratase

Identifiers
- EC no.: 4.2.1.58
- CAS no.: 9030-78-8

Databases
- IntEnz: IntEnz view
- BRENDA: BRENDA entry
- ExPASy: NiceZyme view
- KEGG: KEGG entry
- MetaCyc: metabolic pathway
- PRIAM: profile
- PDB structures: RCSB PDB PDBe PDBsum
- Gene Ontology: AmiGO / QuickGO
Search
- PMC: articles
- PubMed: articles
- NCBI: proteins

In enzymology, a crotonoyl-[acyl-carrier-protein] hydratase (EC 4.2.1.58) is an enzyme that catalyzes the chemical reaction

(3R)-3-hydroxybutanoyl-[acyl-carrier-protein] $\rightleftharpoons$ but-2-enoyl-[acyl-carrier-protein] + H_{2}O

Hence, this enzyme has one substrate, [[(3R)-3-hydroxybutanoyl-[acyl-carrier-protein]]], and two products, [[but-2-enoyl-[acyl-carrier-protein]]] and H_{2}O.

This enzyme belongs to the family of lyases, specifically the hydro-lyases, which cleave carbon-oxygen bonds. The systematic name of this enzyme class is (3R)-3-hydroxybutanoyl-[acyl-carrier-protein] hydro-lyase (but-2-enoyl-[acyl-carrier protein]-forming). Other names in common use include (3R)-3-hydroxybutanoyl-[acyl-carrier-protein] hydro-lyase, beta-hydroxybutyryl acyl carrier protein dehydrase, beta-hydroxybutyryl acyl carrier protein (ACP) dehydrase, beta-hydroxybutyryl acyl carrier protein dehydrase, enoyl acyl carrier protein hydrase, crotonyl acyl carrier protein hydratase, 3-hydroxybutyryl acyl carrier protein dehydratase, beta-hydroxybutyryl acyl carrier, and protein dehydrase. This enzyme participates in fatty acid biosynthesis.
