= Aluminium phosphide poisoning =

Type of poisoning

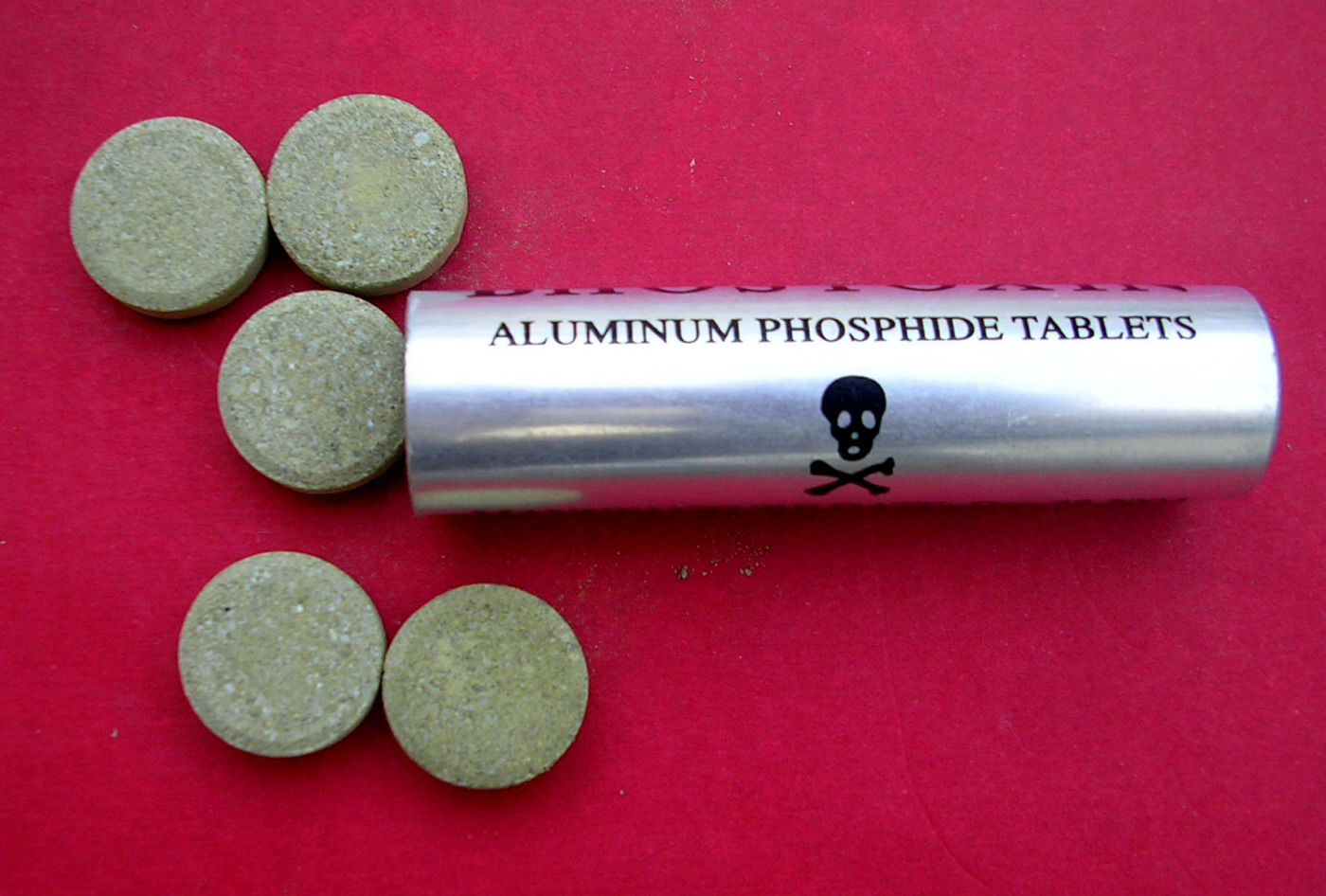
Aluminium phosphide tablets.

Aluminium phosphide poisoning is poisoning that occurs as a result of excessive exposure to aluminium phosphide (AlP). It is readily available as a fumigant for stored cereal grains and sold under various brand names such as QuickPhos, Salphos and Celphos. Aluminium phosphide is highly toxic, especially when consumed from a freshly opened container. Acute aluminium phosphide poisoning (AAlPP) is a large though under-reported problem throughout the world, particularly in the Indian subcontinent.

== Signs, symptoms, and diagnosis ==
After ingestion, toxic features usually develop within a few minutes. The major lethal consequence of aluminium phosphide ingestion is profound circulatory collapse, and is reportedly secondary to these toxins generated, which lead due to direct effects on cardiac muscle cells, fluid loss, and adrenal gland damage. The signs and symptoms are non-specific, dose dependent and evolve with time passing. The dominant clinical feature is severe hypotension refractory to dopamine therapy. Other features may include dizziness, fatigue, tightness in the chest, headache, nausea, vomiting, diarrhea, ataxia, numbness, paraesthesia, tremor, muscle weakness, diplopia and jaundice. If severe inhalation occurs, the patient may develop acute respiratory distress syndrome (ARDS), heart failure, arrhythmias, convulsion and coma. Late manifestation include liver and kidney toxicities. Death can result from profound shock, myocarditis and multi-organ failure.

The diagnosis of AAlP usually depends on the clinical suspicion or history (self-report or by attendants). In some nations, tablets of AlP are also referred to as "rice tablets" and, if there is a history of rice tablet ingestion, then it should be treated differently from other types of rice tablets that are made up of herbal products. For a silver nitrate test on gastric aspirate, diluted gastric content can be positive.

== Mechanism of toxicity, level ==
The toxicity of aluminium phosphide is attributed to the liberation of phosphine gas, a cytotoxic compound that causes free radical mediated injury, inhibits vital cellular enzymes and is directly corrosive to tissues. The following reactions release phosphine when AlP reacts with fluids in the body:

AlP + 3 H_{2}O → Al(OH)_{3} + PH_{3}, and
AlP + 3 HCl → AlCl_{3} + PH_{3} (stomach)

The CDC has classified phosphine as immediately dangerous to life at 50 parts per million.

== Management and outcome ==
The management of AAlPP remains purely supportive because no specific cure exists. Mortality rates approach 60%. Correction of metabolic acidosis is a cornerstone of treatment. The role of magnesium sulfate as a potential therapy in AlP poisoning may decrease the likelihood of a fatal outcome, and has been described in many studies.

== Prognosis ==
Aluminium phosphide has a fatal dose of between 0.15 and 0.5 grams (0.0053 and 0.0176 oz). The mortality rates from AAlPP vary from 35 to 85 percent. The actual numbers of cases may be much larger, as less than five percent of those with AAlPP eventually reach a tertiary care center. Since 1992, when aluminium phosphide became freely available in the market, it had, reportedly, overtaken all other forms of deliberate poisoning, such as organophosphorus and barbiturate poisoning, in North India. In a 25-year-long study on 5,933 unnatural deaths in northwest India, aluminium phosphide poisoning was found to be the major cause of death among all cases of poisonings.

== Incidents ==
It has been reported to be the most common method of suicide in North India.

Deaths have also been reported in Iran.

In January 2017, four children died at a trailer park in Amarillo, Texas, after the pesticide was used under the home to kill rats.

Several incidents of death in travelers in Thailand and other parts of Southeast Asia may have been caused by aluminum phosphide or chlorpyrifos, an organophosphate insecticide, used in an attempt to kill bedbugs in hotels.

On November 16 2019, 2 children and an adult were killed in Timișoara, Romania, after the residential complex they were living in had been improperly vented after fumigation with AlP. It was later found there were other cases in the country that could have been linked to the misuse of this chemical.

In February 2020, aluminum phosphide poisoning resulted in one death and three serious injuries aboard a cargo ship traveling near France, as the result of a botched fumigation procedure.

In December 2021, an 11-year old girl died in London and another child was seriously injured by phosphine inhalation after a neighbour used illegally imported aluminum phosphide tablets in an attempt to remove a bedbug infestation in an apartment building.

In November 2025 four members of a German family died and several guests got sick after they had been exposed to aluminium phosphide in a hotel in Istanbul. The staff of a pest control company had used the poison to fight bedbugs in other rooms of the hotel and investigators suspected it to have spread through the ventilation system.

In a study from Saudi Arabia, poisoning was most common during fumigation of households.
