= Oleoyl-(acyl-carrier-protein) hydrolase =

Enzyme

acyl-ACP thioesterase

Identifiers
- EC no.: 3.1.2.14
- CAS no.: 68009-83-6

Databases
- IntEnz: IntEnz view
- BRENDA: BRENDA entry
- ExPASy: NiceZyme view
- KEGG: KEGG entry
- MetaCyc: metabolic pathway
- PRIAM: profile
- PDB structures: RCSB PDB PDBe PDBsum
- Gene Ontology: AmiGO / QuickGO
Search
- PMC: articles
- PubMed: articles
- NCBI: proteins

The enzyme oleoyl-[acyl-carrier-protein] hydrolase (EC 3.1.2.14) catalyzes the reaction

an oleoyl-[acyl-carrier-protein] + H_{2}O $\rightleftharpoons$ an [acyl-carrier-protein] + oleate

This enzyme belongs to the family of hydrolases, specifically those acting on thioester bonds. The systematic name is oleoyl-[acyl-carrier-protein] hydrolase. Other names in common use include acyl-[acyl-carrier-protein] hydrolase, acyl-ACP-hydrolase, acyl-acyl carrier protein hydrolase, oleoyl-ACP thioesterase, and oleoyl-acyl carrier protein thioesterase. It participates in fatty acid biosynthesis.

As of late 2007, two structures have been solved for this class of enzymes, with PDB accession codes 2OWN and 2PFF.
