= MECR =

Protein-coding gene in humans

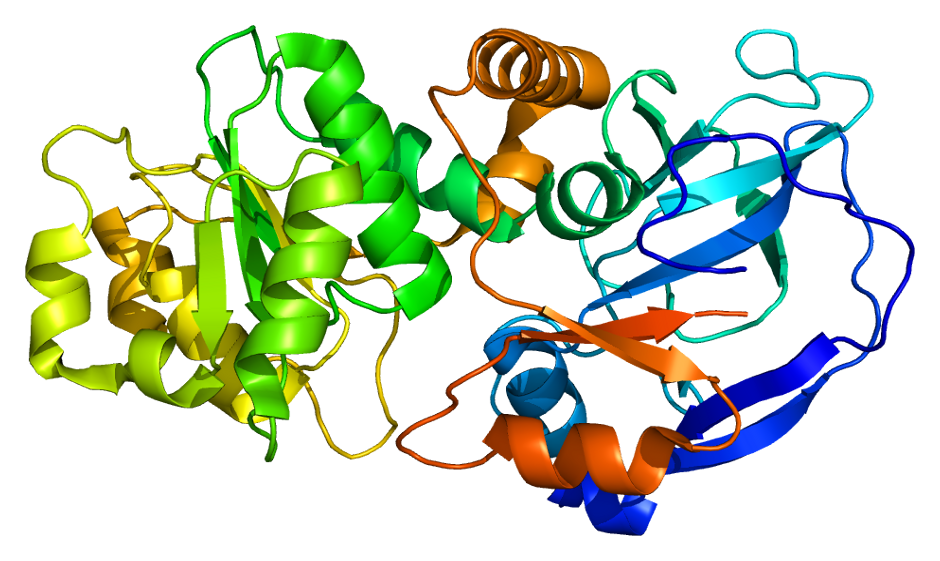

Identifiers
- Aliases: MECR, CGI-63, FASN2B, NRBF1, mitochondrial trans-2-enoyl-CoA reductase, ETR1, nuclear receptor binding factor 1, trans-2-enoyl-CoA reductase, mitochondrial, mitochondrial 2-enoyl thioester reductase
- External IDs: OMIM: 608205; MGI: 1349441; GeneCards: MECR
Available structures
| PDB | Ortholog search: PDBe RCSB |
| PDB | List of PDB id codes 1ZSY, 2VCY |
Enzyme activity
| EC # | BRENDA | ExPASy | KEGG | MetaCyc |
|---|---|---|---|---|
| 1.3.1.104 | ↗ | ↗ | ↗ | ↗ |

Gene location (Human)
| Chr. | Chromosome 1 (human) |
| Band | 1p35.3 | Start | 29,192,657 bp |
| Band | 1p35.3 | End | 29,230,942 bp |

Gene location (Mouse)
| Chr. | Chromosome 4 (mouse) |
| Band | 4|4 D2.3 | Start | 131,570,781 bp |
| Band | 4|4 D2.3 | End | 131,595,097 bp |
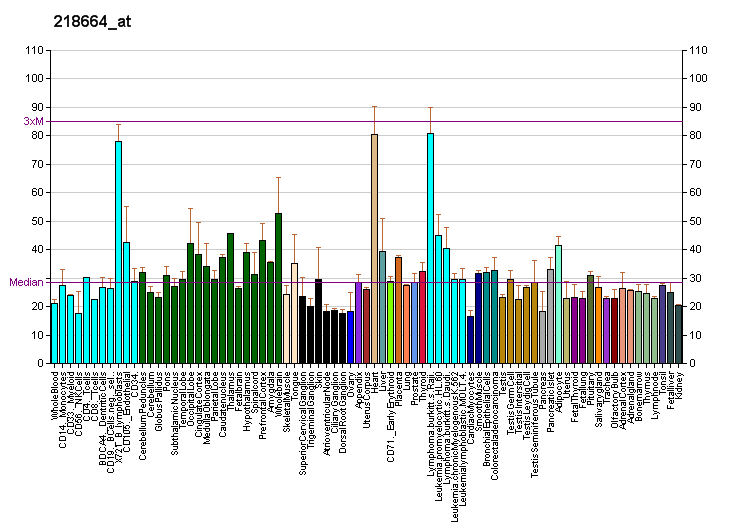
RNA expression pattern
| Bgee | Human / Mouse (ortholog); Top expressed in: apex of heart; muscle of thigh; gastrocnemius muscle; prefrontal cortex; anterior cingulate cortex; left ventricle; right frontal lobe; right auricle of heart; C1 segment; right adrenal gland / Top expressed in: brown adipose tissue; neural layer of retina; right kidney; lens; proximal tubule; lip; lumbar spinal ganglion; primary oocyte; epithelium of stomach; left colon; More reference expression data |
| BioGPS | More reference expression data |
Gene ontology
| Molecular function | oxidoreductase activity; trans-2-enoyl-CoA reductase (NADPH) activity |
| Cellular component | cytoplasm; mitochondrion; nucleus; mitochondrial matrix |
| Biological process | fatty acid biosynthetic process; lipid metabolism; fatty acid metabolic process; fatty acid beta-oxidation |
Sources:Amigo / QuickGO
Orthologs
| Databases | NCBI: entry; OMA: entry |
| Species | Human | Mouse |
| Entrez | 51102 | 26922 |
| Ensembl | ENSG00000116353 | ENSMUSG00000028910 |
| UniProt | Q9BV79 | Q9DCS3 |
| RefSeq (mRNA) | NM_001024732; NM_016011; NM_001349711; NM_001349712; NM_001349713 NM_001349714; NM_001349715; NM_001349716; NM_001349717 | NM_025297 |
| RefSeq (protein) | NP_001019903; NP_057095; NP_001336640; NP_001336641; NP_001336642 NP_001336643; NP_001336644; NP_001336645; NP_001336646 | NP_079573 |
| Location (UCSC) | Chr 1: 29.19 – 29.23 Mb | Chr 4: 131.57 – 131.6 Mb |
| PubMed search |
- Wikidata
| View/Edit Human | View/Edit Mouse |

Mitochondrial trans-2-enoyl-CoA reductase (MECR) is an enzyme that in humans is encoded by the MECR gene. It belongs to the enzyme class of oxidoreductases and catalyzes the last step of mitochondrial fatty acid synthesis (mtFAS). In doing so, MECR makes the fatty acyl chain bound to mitochondrial acyl carrier protein (mtACP) available again for elongation. MECR thereby contributes to mitochondrial respiration and oxidative phosphorylation. Beyond its mitochondrial role, a cytosolic and nuclear isoform (cMECR) has been linked to PPARα-dependent transcription. Pathogenic variants in the MECR gene cause MEPAN syndrome.

== Structure ==
The MECR gene is located on chromosome 1 at locus p35.3 and contains 18 exons. Through alternative splicing, it produces nine protein-coding mRNA transcripts, which encode five isoforms of mitochondrial trans-2-enoyl-CoA reductase (MECR). The cMECR isoform lacks the N-terminal mitochondrial targeting sequence and localizes to the cytosol and nucleus.

MECR forms a dimer with a bent substrate-binding cavity between the two monomers that accommodates acyl substrates with carbon chain lengths from C4 to C16.

== Reaction ==
The reaction catalyzed by MECR can be summarized as follows:

trans-2-enoyl-mtACP + NADPH + H^{+} → acyl-mtACP + NADP^{+}

== Function ==
MECR catalyzes the last step of the mitochondrial fatty acid synthesis pathway. By using NADPH to reduce trans-2-enoyl-mtACP to saturated acyl-mtACP, MECR prepares the acyl chain for another round of elongation.

The MECR gene encodes mitochondrial trans-2-enoyl-CoA reductase, which catalyzes the last step of mitochondrial fatty acid synthesis (mtFAS). Condensation in mtFAS produces an unsaturated fatty acyl chain bound to mtACP. It must undergo reduction and dehydration reactions to become saturated, making it available again for the next elongation cycle. MECR completes this process by reducing the trans double bond between carbon atoms 2 and 3, yielding a saturated acyl-mtACP species. NADPH, whose availability in mitochondria depends on NADK2, provides the required reducing power. Through repeated elongation cycles, mitochondrial fatty acid synthesis generates acyl-mtACP species with chain lengths from C2 to C16. Octanoyl-mtACP (C8) serves as the precursor for lipoic acid biosynthesis and subsequent protein lipoylation, which is essential for several mitochondrial enzyme complexes, including the pyruvate dehydrogenase complex, the 2-oxoglutarate dehydrogenase complex, the branched-chain alpha-keto acid dehydrogenase complex, the 2-oxoadipate dehydrogenase complex, and the glycine cleavage system. Longer-chain acyl-mtACP species interact with LYRM proteins that are required for iron–sulfur cluster biogenesis and respiratory-chain assembly. In addition, mtFAS has been linked to mitochondrial translation and to levels of polyamines, including spermidine and spermine, as well as bioactive lipids such as lysophospholipids and sphingolipids.

MECR has also been reported to bind transcription factors of the PPAR family and activate transcription, suggesting a possible link between nuclear gene regulation and mtFAS.

== Clinical significance ==
Pathogenic variants in the MECR gene cause MEPAN syndrome, a rare autosomal recessive mitochondrial metabolic disorder characterized by childhood-onset dystonia, optic atrophy, and basal ganglia signal abnormalities on MRI. A later-onset phenotype with LHON-like optic neuropathy but without movement disorder or basal ganglia signal abnormalities has also been reported.

== See also ==
- ACSF3
- MCAT
- Combined malonic and methylmalonic aciduria (CMAMMA)
