= MEPAN syndrome =

Rare metabolic disorder

- Other names: Mitochondrial enoyl CoA reductase protein-associated neurodegeneration syndrome; MECR-related neurologic disorder; Dystonia, childhood-onset, with optic atrophy and basal ganglia abnormalities (DYTOABG); Autosomal recessive childhood-onset dystonia, DYT29 type; Childhood-onset generalized dystonia-optic atrophy syndrome; DYT29; Dystonia 29
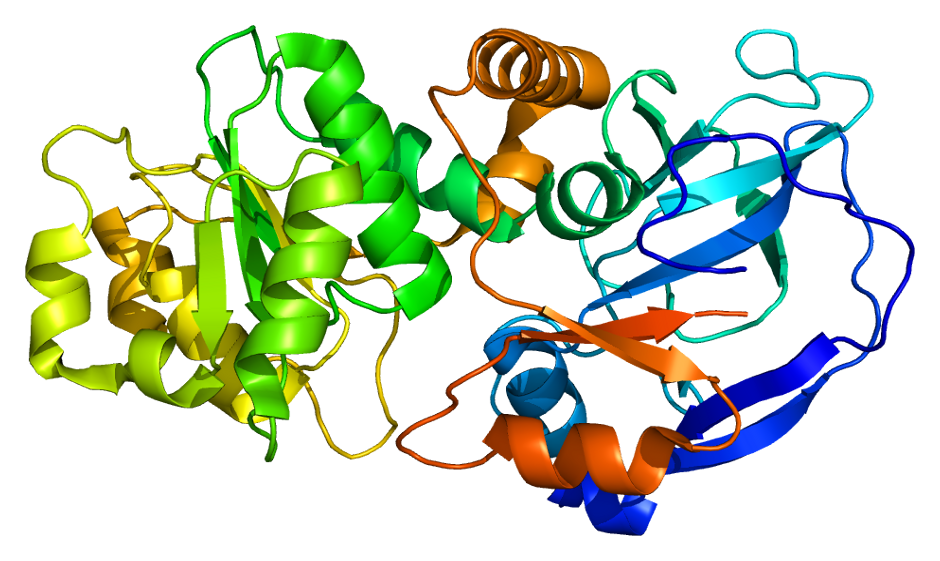
- Ribbon diagram of mitochondrial trans-2-enoyl-CoA reductase (MECR)
- Specialty: Medical genetics
- Usual onset: Childhood, Infancy
- Causes: Pathogenic biallelic variants in the MECR gene
- Diagnostic method: Molecular genetic testing
- Frequency: <1:1,000,000

Mitochondrial enoyl reductase protein-associated neurodegeneration (MePAN, MEPAN), also known as MEPAN syndrome, is a rare genetic mitochondrial metabolic disorder. It typically presents in early childhood with dystonia, optic atrophy, and basal ganglia signal abnormalities, although an LHON-like optic neuropathy presentation has also been reported. The disorder is caused by pathogenic variants in the MECR gene, which encodes mitochondrial trans-2-enoyl-CoA reductase (MECR), the enzyme responsible for the last step of mitochondrial fatty acid synthesis (mtFAS). MEPAN was first described by Heimer et al. in 2016.

== Symptoms and signs ==
In the literature, the following symptoms and signs have been reported:

- dystonia
- chorea
- ataxia
- dysarthria
- optic atrophy
- nystagmus
- basal ganglia signal abnormalities on MRI
- LHON-like optic neuropathy

The movement disorder typically begins in early childhood, usually between 1 and 6.5 years of age, and consists mainly of dystonia, which can be accompanied by chorea and/or ataxia. Dysarthria progressively impairs speech fluency and intelligibility. Optic atrophy tends to develop later, most often between 4 and 12 years of age.

In addition to the classic early-onset presentation, the MECR-related disease spectrum also includes a later-onset phenotype with LHON-like optic neuropathy, but without the typical movement disorder and basal ganglia signal abnormalities.

== Cause ==
MEPAN is an inborn autosomal-recessive metabolic disorder caused by homozygous or compound heterozygous pathogenic variants in the MECR gene. In humans, the gene is located on chromosome 1 at locus p35.3, contains 18 exons, and encodes the enzyme mitochondrial trans-2-enoyl-CoA reductase (MECR). Through alternative splicing, the gene produces nine protein-coding mRNA transcripts that encode five MECR protein isoforms. In MEPAN, pathogenic variants in MECR lead to reduced enzyme abundance or unstable enzyme forms, which may be misfolded or truncated. It is assumed that complete loss-of-function is embryonically lethal in humans, since mice with complete Mecr knockout do not survive embryonic development.

MEPAN can occur in individuals of any ethnicity, although it has been reported more frequently among individuals of Ashkenazi Jewish ancestry. Orphanet places MEPAN in the prevalence category of fewer than 1 affected person per 1,000,000.

== Pathophysiology ==
MECR catalyzes the last step of the mitochondrial fatty acid synthesis pathway. By using NADPH to reduce trans-2-enoyl-mtACP to saturated acyl-mtACP, MECR prepares the acyl chain for another round of elongation.

MECR encodes the enzyme mitochondrial trans-2-enoyl-CoA reductase, which catalyzes the last step in mitochondrial fatty acid synthesis (mtFAS). The enzyme completes the series of reactions that convert the mtACP-bound unsaturated fatty acyl chain to a saturated form. This makes the fatty acyl chain available again for the next elongation cycle. NADPH, whose availability in mitochondria depends on NADK2, provides the required reducing power. Through repeated cycles, mitochondrial fatty acid synthesis produces acyl-mtACP species with chain lengths ranging from C2 to C16. The reaction catalyzed by MECR can be summarized as follows:

trans-2-enoyl-mtACP + NADPH + H^{+} → acyl-mtACP + NADP^{+}

The resulting acyl-mtACP species are involved in several mitochondrial processes: octanoyl-mtACP (C8) serves as the precursor for lipoic acid synthesis and subsequent protein lipoylation, whereas longer-chain acyl-mtACP species bind to LYRM proteins involved in respiratory-chain assembly and iron–sulfur cluster biogenesis. mtFAS activity has also been linked to mitochondrial translation, and to levels of polyamines, including spermidine and spermine, as well as bioactive lipids such as lysophospholipids and sphingolipids.

MECR has also been reported to bind transcription factors of the PPAR family and activate transcription, suggesting a possible link between nuclear gene regulation and mitochondrial fatty acid synthesis.

In MEPAN, dysfunctional MECR impairs mitochondrial fatty acid synthesis, which has been associated with several downstream mitochondrial abnormalities. Evidence for impaired protein lipoylation comes from patient fibroblasts, which showed decreased lipoylation of DLAT, a subunit of the pyruvate dehydrogenase complex, and DLST, a subunit used by the 2-oxoglutarate dehydrogenase complex and 2-oxoadipate dehydrogenase complex. However, a MEPAN mouse model showed a tissue-specific pattern, with reduced protein lipoylation in the cerebellum and cortex but not the retina. This suggests that optic neuropathy may not be caused by impaired retinal lipoylation. In the same mouse model, loss of mtACP acylation was proposed to disrupt interactions with LYRM proteins, thereby impairing the iron–sulfur cluster assembly machinery and altering respiratory-chain complex and supercomplex formation. Consistent with impaired iron–sulfur cluster biogenesis, patient fibroblasts have also been reported to accumulate increased levels of iron and ceramides. Reduced activity of the iron–sulfur cluster-dependent enzyme aconitase was proposed to promote citrate accumulation and thereby lead to increased de novo ceramide synthesis. In fly models, reducing iron through a low-iron diet or chelation, or lowering ceramide levels pharmacologically, suppressed neurodegenerative phenotypes.

In the MEPAN mouse model, mitochondrial respiration was reduced in the cerebellum but not the cortex, suggesting region-specific mitochondrial dysfunction consistent with the motor-predominant phenotype.

MECR has also been implicated in immune-cell metabolism, as T-cell-specific loss of Mecr in mice impaired activated CD4+ T-cell fitness and inflammatory function, with possible relevance to immune function in MEPAN patients.

== Diagnosis ==
MEPAN is suspected based on the clinical presentation, including early-onset movement disorder, optic atrophy, and basal ganglia signal abnormalities on MRI. Confirmation requires molecular genetic testing, which may involve single-gene testing of MECR or a phenotype-based multigene panel, such as a dystonia panel. If the presentation is indistinguishable from other childhood-onset dystonias, broader genomic testing may be used, most commonly exome sequencing, but also genome sequencing. The diagnosis is established when the clinical presentation is consistent with MEPAN and pathogenic or likely pathogenic variants are identified in both copies of the MECR gene.

=== Differential diagnosis ===
The differential diagnosis includes disorders with overlapping features such as childhood-onset movement abnormalities, basal ganglia signal changes on MRI, or optic atrophy. These include Leigh syndrome, Leber hereditary optic neuropathy (LHON), glutaric aciduria type 1, D-2-hydroxyglutaric aciduria, biotin-thiamine-responsive basal ganglia disease, Huntington disease, chorea-acanthocytosis, dentatorubral-pallidoluysian atrophy (DRPLA), Wilson disease, and neurodegeneration with brain iron accumulation (NBIA).

== Treatment ==
No curative treatment for MEPAN has been established. Dystonia may be treated with anticholinergic agents, baclofen, or benzodiazepines, although adverse effects can limit their use. In two children with MEPAN and severe dystonia that did not respond adequately to medication, deep brain stimulation (DBS) with individually selected stimulation targets has been reported, resulting in improved dystonia scores. Physical and occupational therapy, together with mobility aids, may help maintain range of movement, daily living skills, and mobility. Dysarthria may require speech therapy or augmentative communication devices, and visual impairment may be managed with visual aids.

=== Experimental therapeutic approaches ===
An empirical treatment with mitochondrial dietary supplements ("mito cocktail") consisting of coenzyme Q10, riboflavin, thiamine, alpha-lipoic acid, octanoic acid, vitamin E, and vitamin C is mentioned in the literature, but its efficacy has not been established. A related approach using lipoic acid and a medium-chain triglyceride-rich formula altered plasma and cerebellar fatty acid profiles in a Purkinje cell-specific Mecr knockout mouse model, but did not prevent Purkinje cell loss or neurodegeneration.

In preclinical drug-repurposing research, echinocandins were identified as possible therapeutic candidates for MEPAN. In yeast models with engineered human MECR variants, rescue was observed only for missense variants that retained a folded MECR protein. Among the tested echinocandins, anidulafungin showed the strongest improvement of mitochondrial function in patient fibroblasts.

A preclinical gene therapy for MEPAN based on a self-complementary AAV9 vector is under development. The vector is intended to deliver MECR and produce strong MECR protein expression in neural tissue in mouse models.

Preclinical research has also proposed delivering an engineered bacterial lipoate protein ligase A (LplA) enzyme to human-cell mitochondria to bypass defective de novo lipoic acid synthesis. In human MECR-knockout cells supplied with exogenous lipoic acid, this approach restored protein lipoylation and improved cellular respiration.

== See also ==
- Combined malonic and methylmalonic aciduria (CMAMMA)
