= GntR-like bacterial transcription factors =

Bacterial regulatory proteins, gntR family
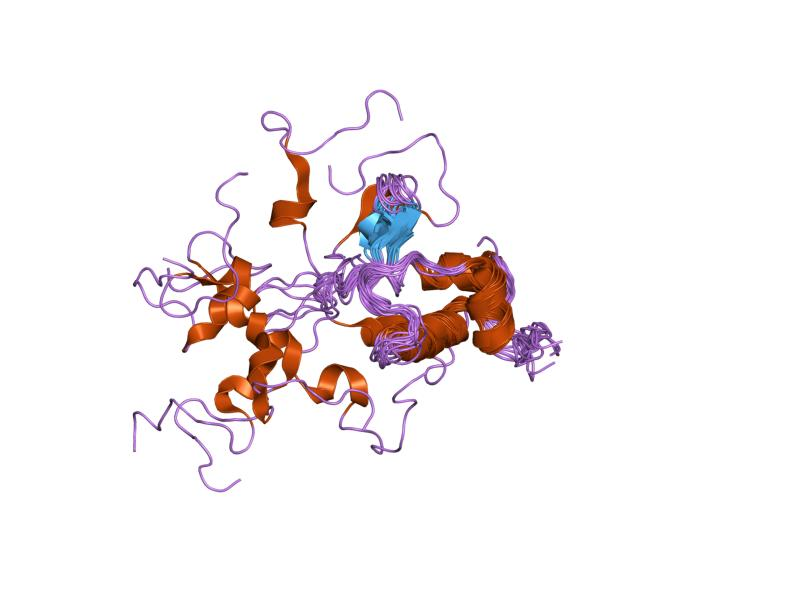
- solution structure of streptmycal repressor trar

Identifiers
- Symbol: GntR
- Pfam: PF00392
- Pfam clan: CL0123
- InterPro: IPR000524
- PROSITE: PDOC00042
- SCOP2: 1e2x / SCOPe / SUPFAM
Available protein structures:
- PDB: IPR000524 PF00392 (ECOD; PDBsum)
- AlphaFold: IPR000524; PF00392

In molecular biology, the GntR-like bacterial transcription factors are a family of transcription factors.

== Background ==
Many bacterial transcription regulation proteins bind DNA through a helix-turn-helix (HTH) motif, which can be classified into subfamilies on the basis of sequence similarities. The HTH GntR family has many members distributed among diverse bacterial groups that regulate various biological processes. It was named GntR after the Bacillus subtilis repressor of the gluconate operon. Family members include GntR, HutC, KorA, NtaR, FadR, ExuR, FarR, DgoR, PhnF and PlmA.

The crystal structure of the FadR protein has been determined. In general, these proteins contain a DNA-binding HTH domain at the N-terminus, and an effector-binding or oligomerisation domain at the C-terminus. The DNA-binding domain is well conserved in structure for the whole of the GntR family, consisting of a 3-helical bundle core with a small beta-sheet (wing); the GntR winged helix structure is similar to that found in several other transcriptional regulator families. The regions outside the DNA-binding domain are more variable and are consequently used to define GntR subfamilies.
