= Long-chain-enoyl-CoA hydratase =

Class of enzymes

long-chain-enoyl-CoA hydratase

Identifiers
- EC no.: 4.2.1.74
- CAS no.: 62009-81-8

Databases
- IntEnz: IntEnz view
- BRENDA: BRENDA entry
- ExPASy: NiceZyme view
- KEGG: KEGG entry
- MetaCyc: metabolic pathway
- PRIAM: profile
- PDB structures: RCSB PDB PDBe PDBsum
- Gene Ontology: AmiGO / QuickGO
Search
- PMC: articles
- PubMed: articles
- NCBI: proteins

The enzyme long-chain-enoyl-CoA hydratase (EC 4.2.1.74) catalyzes the chemical reaction

(3S)-3-hydroxyacyl-CoA $\rightleftharpoons$ trans-2-enoyl-CoA + H_{2}O

This enzyme belongs to the family of lyases, specifically the hydro-lyases, which cleave carbon-oxygen bonds. The systematic name of this enzyme class is long-chain-(3S)-3-hydroxyacyl-CoA hydro-lyase. This enzyme is also called long-chain enoyl coenzyme A hydratase. This enzyme participates in fatty acid elongation in mitochondria and fatty acid metabolism.
