= ThYme (database) =

Database of enzymes

Content
- Description: thioester-active enzymes.

Contact
- Research center: Iowa State University
- Laboratory: Department of Chemical and Biological Engineering
- Authors: David C Cantu
- Primary citation: Cantu & al. (2011)
- Release date: 2010

Access
- Website: http://www.enzyme.cbirc.iastate.edu

ThYme (Thioester-active enzYme) is database of enzymes constituting the fatty acid synthesis and polyketide synthesis cycles.

== See also ==
- Thioester
