= Beta-ketoacyl-ACP synthase I =

3-oxoacyl-[acyl-carrier-protein] synthase I

Identifiers
- EC no.: 2.3.1.41
- CAS no.: 9077-10-5

Databases
- IntEnz: IntEnz view
- BRENDA: BRENDA entry
- ExPASy: NiceZyme view
- KEGG: KEGG entry
- MetaCyc: metabolic pathway
- PRIAM: profile
- PDB structures: RCSB PDB PDBe PDBsum
- Gene Ontology: AmiGO / QuickGO
Search
- PMC: articles
- PubMed: articles
- NCBI: proteins

In enzymology, a beta-ketoacyl-acyl-carrier-protein synthase I (EC 2.3.1.41) is an enzyme that catalyzes the chemical reaction

an acyl-acyl-carrier-protein + malonyl-acyl-carrier-protein $\rightleftharpoons$ a 3-oxoacyl-acyl-carrier-protein + CO_{2} + acyl-carrier-protein

Thus, the two substrates of this enzyme are acyl-acyl-carrier-protein and malonyl-acyl-carrier-protein, whereas its 3 products are 3-oxoacyl-acyl-carrier-protein, CO_{2}, and acyl carrier protein. This enzyme participates in fatty acid biosynthesis. This enzyme belongs to the family of transferases, specifically those acyltransferases transferring groups other than aminoacyl groups.

== Nomenclature ==
The systematic name of this enzyme class is acyl-[acyl-carrier-protein]:malonyl-[acyl-carrier-protein] C-acyltransferase (decarboxylating).

Other names in common use include:

- beta-ketoacyl-ACP synthase I,
- beta-ketoacyl synthetase,
- beta-ketoacyl-ACP synthetase,
- beta-ketoacyl-acyl carrier protein synthetase,
- beta-ketoacyl-[acyl carrier protein] synthase,
- beta-ketoacylsynthase,
- condensing enzyme (CE),
- 3-ketoacyl-acyl carrier protein synthase,
- fatty acid condensing enzyme,
- acyl-malonyl(acyl-carrier-protein)-condensing enzyme,
- acyl-malonyl acyl carrier protein-condensing enzyme,
- beta-ketoacyl acyl carrier protein synthase,
- 3-oxoacyl-[acyl-carrier-protein] synthase,
- 3-oxoacyl:ACP synthase I,
- KASI,
- KAS I,
- FabF1, and
- FabB.
