= Citrate–malate shuttle =

Series of chemical reactions

Citrate ion

Malate ion

The citrate-malate shuttle is a series of chemical reactions, commonly referred to as a biochemical cycle or system, that transports acetyl-CoA in the mitochondrial matrix across the inner and outer mitochondrial membranes for fatty acid synthesis. Mitochondria are enclosed in a double membrane. As the inner mitochondrial membrane is impermeable to acetyl-CoA, the shuttle system is essential to fatty acid synthesis in the cytosol. It plays an important role in the generation of lipids in the liver (hepatic lipogenesis).

The name of the citrate-malate shuttle is derived from the two intermediates – short-lived chemicals that are generated in a reaction step and consumed entirely in the next – citrate and malate that carry the acetyl-CoA molecule across the mitochondrial double membrane.

The citrate–malate shuttle is present in humans and other higher eukaryotic organisms and is closely related to the Krebs cycle. The system is responsible for the transportation of malate into the mitochondrial matrix to serve as an intermediate in the Krebs cycle and the transportation of citrate into the cytosol for secretion in Aspergillus niger, a fungus used in the commercial production of citric acid.

== Mechanism ==
=== Structure of mitochondria ===
All cells need energy to survive. Mitochondria is a double-membrane structure in the body cell that generates and transports essential metabolic products. The three layers of this structure are the outer membrane, intermembrane space, and inner membrane. The space inside the mitochondria is called the mitochondrial matrix, while the region outside is the cytosol. The outer membrane allows most small molecules to pass through. In contrast, the inner membrane transports specific molecules only, which is impermeable to many substances. Therefore, a shuttle is required for the transportation of molecules across the inner membrane. It acts as a pump to drive the substances from the inner membrane to the outside.

=== Component of system ===
On the surface of cells, there are many proteins. Some proteins are involved in recognition, attachment, or transportation. The citrate-malate shuttle system consists of citrate shuttle and malate shuttle, which are carrier proteins. Carrier proteins are present on the cell surface. They transport different molecules across the mitochondria. In this system, the substances being transported are malate and citrate.

The starting material is acetyl-CoA. It is a molecule that is involved in ATP synthesis, protein metabolism, and lipid metabolism. As the inner membrane is not permeable to this molecule, acetyl-CoA needs to be converted into other products for effective transport. It is also the first step of the reaction.

=== Movement of citrate and malate ===
The process occurs in two cellular locations: the cytosol and the mitochondria matrix. A cycle is formed by the system, ensuring that the conversion between acetylene, oxaloacetate, citrate, and malate can continue without the need for foreign molecule addition.

It involves six major steps:

==== Step 1 ====
An acetyl group of acetyl-CoA combines with oxaloacetate to form citrate, releasing the coenzyme group (CoA) in the mitochondrial matrix.

==== Step 2 ====
1. The citrate binds to citrate transporters.
2. The shuttle delivers the citrate from the inner membrane to the intermembrane space.
3. There is a net movement of the citrate from the intermembrane space to the cytosol across the outer membrane, following the concentration gradient.

==== Step 3 ====
1. Using ATP as energy, citrate is broken down into the acetyl group and oxaloacetate.
2. The acetyl group joins the coenzyme in the cytosol, forming acetyl-CoA.

==== Step 4 ====
Oxaloacetate is reduced by NADH to malate in the cytosol, releasing free electrons.

==== Step 5 ====
The malate is transported by the malate shuttle, moving from the cytosol to the matrix.

==== Step 6 ====
The malate is oxidized by NAD^{+} (the oxidizing agent) to oxaloacetate again, releasing NADH. The replenishment of oxaloacetate can be achieved. The oxaloacetate can react with the acetyl-CoA in the first step, completing a cycle.

Summary of reactions
Step	Reactant	Product
1	Acetyl-CoA + Oxaloacetate (Matrix)	Citrate (Matrix)
2	Citrate (Matrix)	Citrate (Cytosol)
3	Citrate (Cytosol) + ATP	Acetyl-CoA + Oxaloacetate (Cytosol)
4	Oxaloacetate (Cytosol) + NADH	Malate (Cytosol) + NAD^{+}
5	Malate (Cytosol)	Malate (Matrix)
6	Malate (Matrix) + NAD^{+}	Oxaloacetate (Matrix) +NADH

== Function ==
The citrate-malate shuttle allows the cell to produce fatty acid with excess acetyl-CoA for storage. The principle is similar to that of insulin, which turns excess glucose in the body into glycogen for storage in the liver cells and skeletal muscles, so that when there is a lack of energy intake, the body could still provide itself with glucose by breaking down glycogen. The citrate-malate shuttle enables more compact storage of chemical energy in the body in the form of fatty acid by transporting acetyl-CoA into the cytosol for fatty acid and cholesterol synthesis. The lipids produced can then be stored so that they can be used in the future.

Acetyl-CoA is generated in the mitochondrial matrix from two sources: pyruvate decarboxylation in glycolysis and the breakdown of fatty acids through β-oxidation, which are both essential pathways of energy production in humans. Pyruvate decarboxylation is the step that connects glycolysis and the Krebs cycle and is regulated by the pyruvate dehydrogenase complex when blood glucose levels are high. Otherwise, fatty acid β-oxidation occurs, and acetyl-CoA is required to generate ATP through the Krebs cycle. In a subject with defective citrate-malate shuttle, acetyl-CoA in mitochondria cannot exit into the cytosol. Fatty acid synthesis is hence hindered, and the body would not be able to store excess energy as efficiently as a normal subject.

In addition, improper functioning of the citrate-malate shuttle can result in disruption of the Krebs cycle.

== Linkage to Krebs cycle ==
The Krebs cycle, also known as the TCA cycle or Citric Acid cycle, is a biochemical pathway that facilitates the breakdown of glucose in a cell. Both citrate and malate involved in the citrate-malate shuttle are necessary intermediates of the Krebs cycle. Usually, oxaloacetate in the Krebs cycle is generated from the carboxylation of pyruvate in the mitochondrion; however, malate generated in the cytosol can also enter the mitochondrion through the transport protein located in the inner mitochondrial membrane to directly join the Krebs cycle.

The mitochondrial transport proteins are encoded by the SLC25 gene in humans and facilitate the transportation of various metabolites, including citrate and malate, in the Krebs cycle. These transport proteins control the flow of metabolites in and out of the inner mitochondrial membrane, which is impermeable to most molecules. They connect the carbohydrate metabolism of the Krebs cycle to fatty acid synthesis in lipogenesis by catalyzing the transportation of acetyl-CoA out of the mitochondrial matrix into the cytosol, which is done in the form of citrate export from the mitochondria to the cytosol. Cytosolic citrate, meaning citrate in the cytosol, is a key substrate for the generation of energy. It releases acetyl-CoA and provides NADPH for fatty acid synthesis, and, in subsequent pathways, generates NAD^{+} for glycolysis. Citrate also activates acetyl-CoA carboxylase, an enzyme that is essential in the fatty acid synthesis pathway.

Citrate–malate shuttle might partly or completely replace the function of the Krebs cycle in cancer cell metabolism.

== Association with cancer ==
=== Alternate metabolic pathway in cancer cell ===
Recent study proposed that the citrate–malate shuttle may contribute to sustaining cancer cells through a β-oxidation-citrate–malate shuttle metabolic pathway. In normal cells, β-oxidation produces acetyl-CoA which enters the Krebs cycle to produce ATP, and β-oxidation cannot continue if the Krebs cycle is impaired and acetyl-CoA accumulates. However, cancer cells may carry out continuous β-oxidation by connecting it to the citrate–malate shuttle. The new metabolic pathway consists of mitochondrial transport proteins and several enzymes, including ATP-citrate lyase (ACLY) and malate dehydrogenases 1 and 2 (MDH1 and MDH2). The proposed metabolic pathway may explain the Warburg effect – that cancer cells produce energy through a suboptimal pathway – and hypoxia in cancer.

The energy efficiency of this pathway is 3.76 times less than the normal β-oxidation Krebs cycle pathway, only producing 26 moles instead of 98 moles of ATP from 1 mole of palmitate.

It is still unsure whether this pathway exists in cancer cells. Factors preventing this pathway from occurring includes lipotoxicity of palmitate and stearate.

=== Liver cancer ===
==== Role of liver ====
The liver contains metabolic active tissues as it is responsible for detoxification, protein and carbohydrate metabolism. Therefore, It needs a lot of energy to function and contains abundant mitochondria. Any abnormalities in mitochondria would affect liver metabolism. If the liver does not work properly, it may produce excess metabolites, leading to accumulation; in contrast, it may also fail to produce certain chemicals. As a result, the imbalance of metabolites may lead to liver cancer development, i.e. hepatocarcinogenesis.

==== Cancer cells ====
The growth and development of normal cells follow a cycle in a controlled and ordered manner. When they are damaged, they will die through a process called apoptosis. However, apoptosis is disrupted in cancer cells, allowing them to divide and grow uncontrollably, potentially invading other tissues or organs. They will not undergo the normal death process of body cells.

Hepatocellular carcinoma (HCC) is a prevalent type of liver cancer that accounts for over 80% of cases. It is lethal cancer due to the remarkable drug tolerance, spread potential and high chance of relapse. Scientists have carried out many kinds of research in finding out the risk factors of HCC progression.

==== Risk factors ====
Metabolic disorder is one of the causes of liver cancer. Mitochondria is responsible for oxidation using NAD^{+}, which is produced in Step 4 of the citrate–malate shuttle system. In high obesity or insulin resistance (diabetes) patients, their body contains large amounts of fatty acid, the shuttle system might not generate sufficient NAD^{+} to metabolize the fat efficiently. They also exhibit a low NAD^{+} level. Thus, it is more likely for obesity or diabetes patients to develop liver cancer.

Moreover, overloading of mitochondria may occur. There is an increase in reactive oxygen species level in the liver. Those species are highly reactive and would attack liver cells. They can damage the DNA strands. Cells with DNA damage may divide abnormally. They might grow into cancer cells, resulting in HCC.

Another risk factor is mutations and overexpressed citrate–malate shuttle. A high frequency mutated gene in a wide range of cancers, Ras oncogene, has a significantly close association to HCC. Many HCC patients carry this gene. They also have abnormal citrate–malate shuttle. The research of Dalian Medical University shows that there is a noticeable increase in the HCC patients' citrate and malate levels, suggesting the possibility of higher activity of citrate–malate shuttle. This mechanism is effective when TCA cycle activity is low. The shuttle also helps the production of fatty acid and lactic acid.

In liver cancer cells, the TCA cycle is blocked, causing accumulation of excess pyruvate. It is a signal of the body defense mechanism. Normally, the cancer cells would die under a high pyruvate level. However, the overexpressed citrate–malate shuttle can remove the excessive pyruvate. In this situation, the natural cell death of liver tumor will not occur. The cancer cells can keep growing.

In addition, high shuttle activity is linked to increase in fatty acid generation. It is also a risk factor of HCC.

== Genetics and evolution ==
=== Mitochondrial diseases ===
Mitochondrial diseases are usually caused by mutation in mitochondrial DNA. These genes regulate different proteins synthesis, including carrier proteins and certain enzymes.

The replication of mitochondrial DNA follows binary fission. In this process, 1 set of genes would divide into 2 sets. The mitochondrial gene of children is inherited from their mother only. If there are any genetic defects or mutations in the mother's mitochondrial DNA, it would be inherited by the children. If those changes in genes can cause mitochondrial diseases, the children have a 100% possibility of acquiring the diseases.

For the malate-oxaloacetate shuttle, 4 major genes are involved. They are PMDH1, MDH, PMDH2, mMDH1. PMDH-1 and PMDH-2 encode two different enzymes that provide NAD^{+} for the oxidation of malate. In addition, MDH and mMDH1 encode for an enzyme that directly oxidizes malate.

=== Importance ===
SLC25 is a family of genes that code for a wide range of mitochondrial transporters, such as the citrate shuttle (SLC25A1). Mutations in these genes can result in dysfunctional mitochondria, which can lead to a significant decrease in the energy production of cells, causing severe metabolic diseases. Symptoms can be particularly severe in organs or tissues that have high energy demand, such as the liver, brain, heart, and kidneys, since these organs require abundant functional mitochondria. Mitochondrial disorders caused by defective or reduced SLC25 gene expression can result in a variety of diseases, such as CATC deficiency, HHH syndrome, Citrin deficiency, autosomal dominant progressive external ophthalmoplegia, Congenital Amish microcephaly, Early epileptic encephalopathy, mitochondrial phosphate carrier deficiency, Ohtahara syndrome, Neuropathy with striatal necrosis, and Congenital sideroblastic anaemia.

SLC25 genes appear to be crucial for the survival of organisms because they appear with high frequency in the genomes of different organisms. This indicates that these genes are important for the adaptation and survival of species in response to the environmental challenges, which is why they are preserved and passed down the generations. In other words, the gene is positively selected for in evolution.
