= Aluminium phosphide =

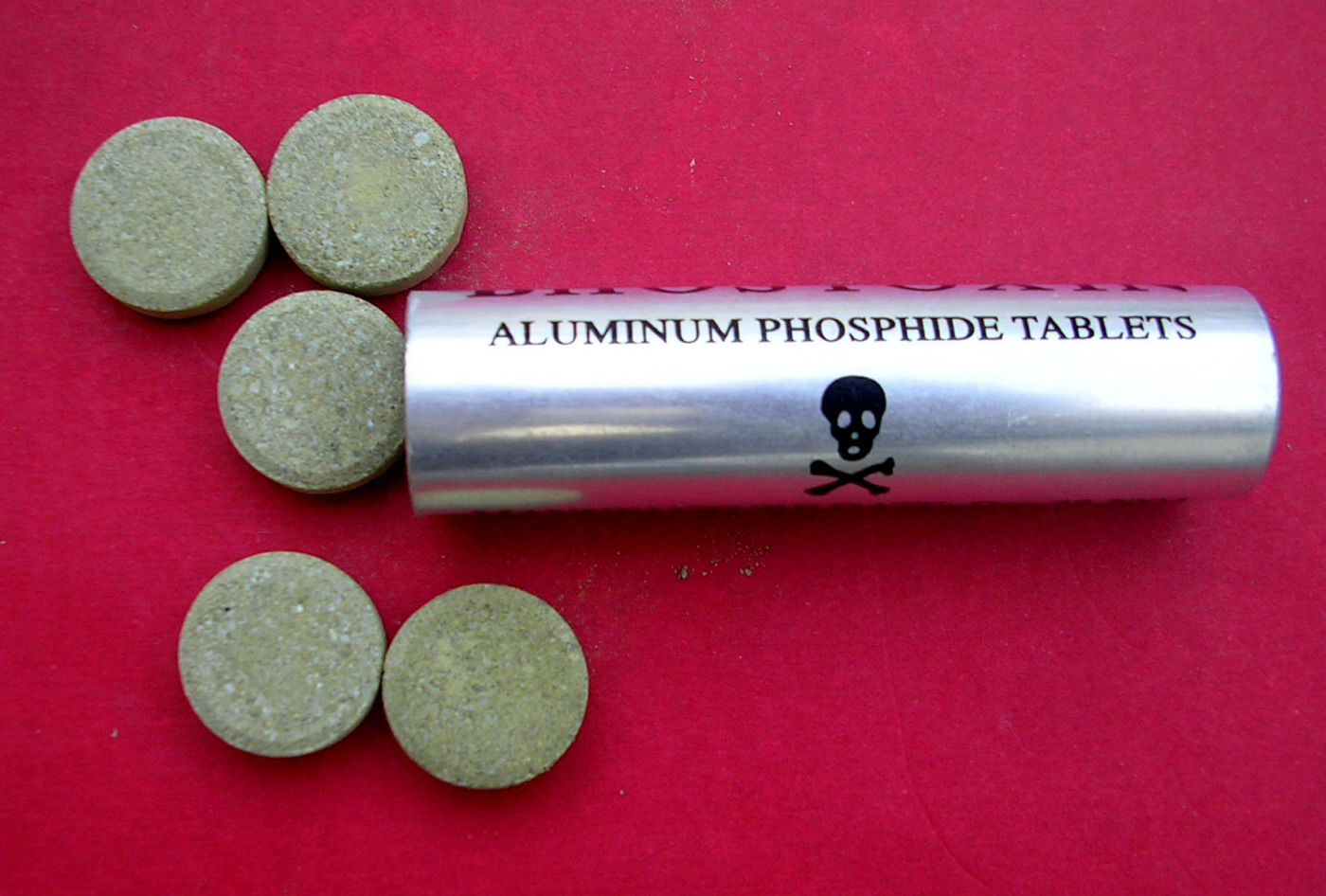
- Aluminium phosphide tablets

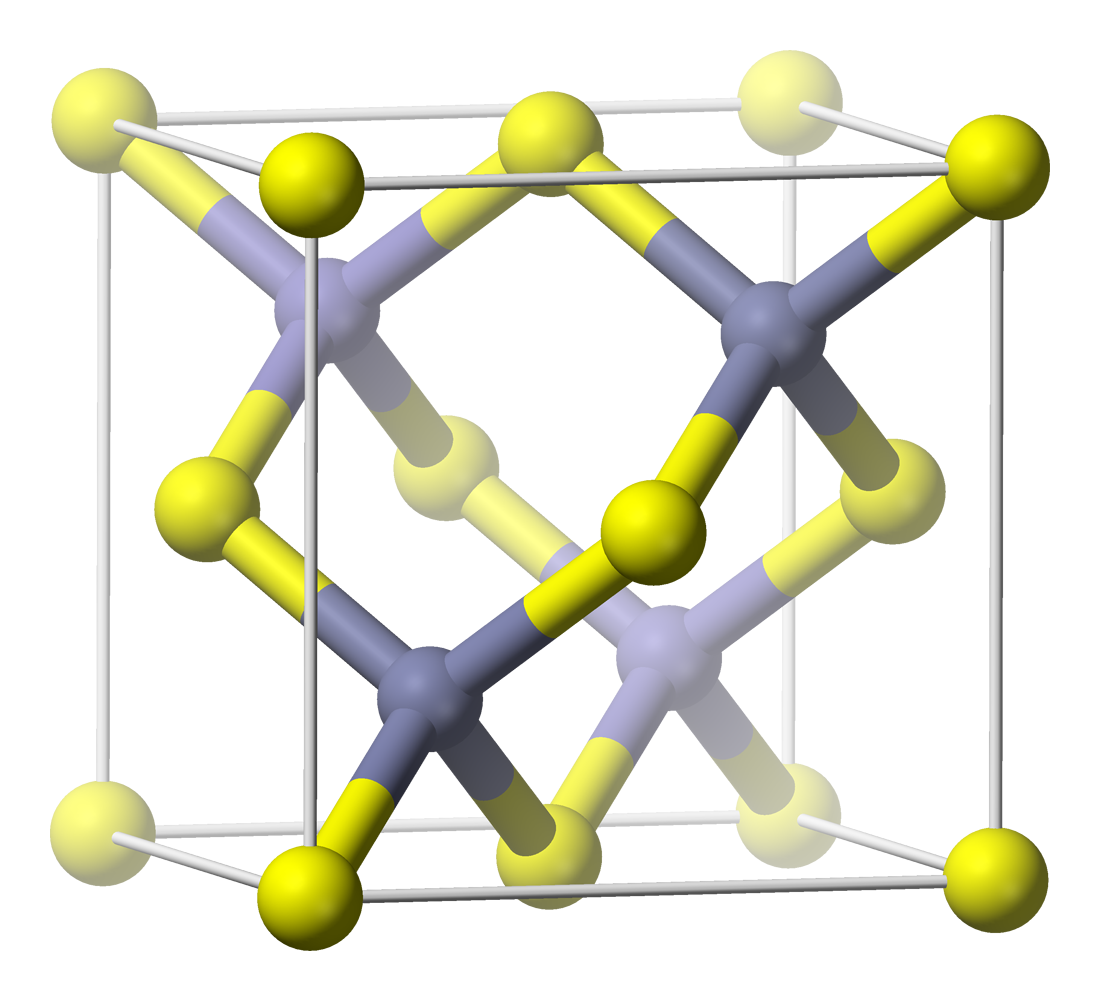
- Crystal structure

Names
- Other names Aluminum phosphide Aluminium(III) phosphide Aluminium monophosphide Phostoxin; Fumitoxin

Identifiers
CAS Number	20859-73-8
3D model (JSmol)	Interactive image
ChemSpider	28171
ECHA InfoCard	100.040.065
EC Number	244-088-0
PubChem CID	30332
RTECS number	BD1400000
UNII	E23DR6L59S
UN number	1397 3048
CompTox Dashboard (EPA)	DTXSID1023867
- InChI: InChI=1S/Al.P Key: PPNXXZIBFHTHDM-UHFFFAOYSA-N; InChI=1/Al.P/rAlP/c1-2 Key: PPNXXZIBFHTHDM-LQQCNYPFAR
- SMILES: [PH+]12[Al-][PH+]3[Al-][PH+]([AlH-]14)[AlH-]1[P+]5([AlH-]38)[Al-]26[PH+]2[AlH-]([P+]4)[PH+]1[Al-][PH+]3[AlH-]2[P+][AlH-]([PH+]6[AlH-]([PH+])[PH+]68)[PH+]([Al-]6)[AlH-]35

Properties
Chemical formula	AlP
Molar mass	57.9552 g/mol
Appearance	Yellow or gray crystals
Odor	garlic-like
Density	2.85 g/cm^{3}
Melting point	2,530 °C (4,590 °F; 2,800 K)
Solubility in water	reacts
Band gap	2.5 eV (indirect)
Refractive index (n_{D})	2.75 (IR), ~3 (Vis)

Structure
Crystal structure	Zincblende
Space group	T^{2}_{d}-F4̅3m
Lattice constant	a = 546.35 pm
Coordination geometry	Tetrahedral

Thermochemistry
Std molar entropy (S^{⦵}_{298})	47.3 J/mol K
Std enthalpy of formation (Δ_{f}H^{⦵}_{298})	−164.4 kJ/mol

Hazards
- GHS labelling
Pictograms	(GHS02: Flammable) (GHS06: Toxic) (GHS09: Environmental hazard)
Signal word	Danger
Hazard statements	H260, H300, H311, H330, H400
Precautionary statements	P223, P231+P232, P260, P264, P270, P271, P273, P280, P284, P301+P310, P302+P352, P304+P340, P310, P312, P320, P321, P330, P335+P334, P361, P363, P370+P378, P391, P402+P404, P403+P233, P405, P501
NFPA 704 (fire diamond)	4 1 2 W
Flash point	> 800 °C (1,470 °F; 1,070 K)
- Lethal dose or concentration (LD, LC)
LD_{50} (median dose)	11.5 mg/kg
Safety data sheet (SDS)	External MSDS
- Except where otherwise noted, data are given for materials in their standard state (at 25 °C [77 °F], 100 kPa). verify (what is ?) Infobox references

Aluminium phosphide is a highly toxic inorganic compound with the chemical formula AlP, used as a wide band gap semiconductor and a fumigant. This colorless solid is generally sold as a grey-green-yellow powder or pellet due to the presence of impurities arising from hydrolysis and oxidation.

It is used by farmers, pest controllers, gamekeepers and estate managers as a fumigant pesticide.

== Properties ==
AlP crystals are dark grey to dark yellow in color and have a zincblende crystal structure with a lattice constant of 5.4510 Å at 300 K. They are thermodynamically stable up to 1,000 °C (1,830 °F).

Aluminium phosphide reacts vigorously with water or acids to release phosphine. The phosphine is the basis of the toxicity of AlP.

== Preparation ==
AlP is synthesized by combination of the elements:

4 Al + P_{4} → 4 AlP

== Uses ==
=== Pesticide ===
AlP is used as a rodenticide, insecticide, and fumigant for stored cereal grains. It is used to kill small verminous mammals such as moles and rodents. The tablets or pellets, known as "wheat pills", typically also contain other chemicals that evolve ammonia and carbon dioxide (e.g. ammonium carbamate), which help to reduce the potential for spontaneous ignition or explosion of the phosphine gas.

AlP is used as both a fumigant and an oral pesticide. As a rodenticide, aluminium phosphide pellets are provided as a mixture with food for consumption by the rodents. The acid in the digestive system of the rodent reacts with the phosphide to generate the toxic phosphine gas. Other pesticides similar to aluminium phosphide are zinc phosphide and calcium phosphide. In this application, aluminium phosphide can be encountered under various brand names, e.g. PestPhos, Quickphos, Celphos, Fostox, Fumitoxin, Phostek, Phostoxin, Talunex, Fieldphos, PH3, and Weevil-Cide. It generates phosphine gas according to the following hydrolysis equation:

AlP + 3 H_{2}O → Al(OH)_{3} + PH_{3}

It is used as a fumigant when other pesticide applications are impractical and when structures and installations are being treated, such as in ships, aircraft, and grain silos. All of these structures can be effectively sealed or enclosed in a gastight membrane, thereby containing and concentrating the phosphine fumes. Fumigants are also applied directly to rodent burrows.

=== Semiconductor applications ===
Industrially, AlP is a semiconductor material that is usually alloyed with other binary materials for applications in devices such as light-emitting diodes (e.g. aluminium gallium indium phosphide).

== Toxicology ==
Highly poisonous, aluminium phosphide has been used for suicide. Fumigation has also caused unintentional deaths. Known as "rice tablet" in Iran, for its use to preserve rice, there have been frequent incidents of accidental or intentional death. There is a campaign by the Iranian Forensic Medicine Organization to stop its use as a pesticide.

Recycling of used aluminium phosphide containers caused the death of three family members in Alcalá de Guadaira, Spain. They had been keeping them in plastic sacks in their bathroom. The deaths occurred accidentally due to aluminium phosphide reacting with water or moisture, and becoming phosphine, leading to their death within hours.

Aluminium phosphide poisoning is considered a wide-scale problem in the Indian subcontinent.

== Manufacturers ==
It is manufactured by UPL Corporation globally, Intech Organics in India, Scimplify in the USA and others.

== Regulation ==
In the UK, a license and "appropriate training" are required to purchase it. As of 2010, it was still available over the counter in India though "stricter norms" according to one author had been adopted.

In the EU, it is an approved pesticide. The expiration of the approval was postponed twice, the last time on November 13, 2025.
