= Condensation reaction =

Chemical reaction where molecules are combined and a small molecule is lost

In organic chemistry, a condensation reaction is a type of chemical reaction in which two molecules are combined to form a single molecule, usually with the loss of a small molecule such as water. If water is lost, the reaction is also known as a dehydration synthesis. However other molecules can also be lost, such as ammonia, ethanol, acetic acid and hydrogen sulfide.

The addition of the two molecules typically proceeds in a step-wise fashion to the addition product, usually in equilibrium, and with loss of a water molecule (hence the name condensation). The reaction may otherwise involve the functional groups of the molecule, and is a versatile class of reactions that can occur in acidic or basic conditions or in the presence of a catalyst. This class of reactions is a vital part of life as it is essential to the formation of peptide bonds between amino acids and to the biosynthesis of fatty acids.

Idealized scheme showing condensation of two amino acids to give a peptide bond.

Many variations of condensation reactions exist. Common examples include the aldol condensation and the Knoevenagel condensation, which both form water as a by-product, as well as the Claisen condensation and the Dieckman condensation (intramolecular Claisen condensation), which form alcohols as by-products.

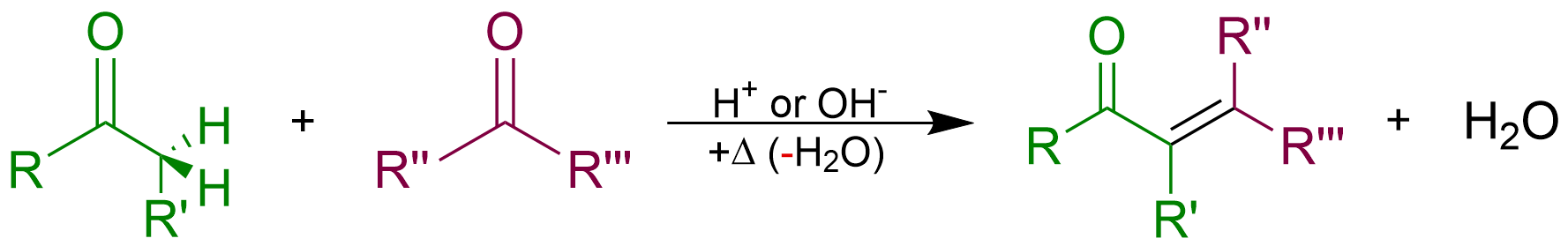

== Synthesis of prebiotic molecules ==
Condensation reactions likely played major roles in the synthesis of the first biotic molecules including early peptides and nucleic acids. In fact, condensation reactions would be required at multiple steps in RNA oligomerization: the condensation of nucleobases and sugars, nucleoside phosphorylation, and nucleotide polymerization.

== See also ==
- Anabolism
- Hydrolysis, the opposite of a condensation reaction
- Condensed tannins
