= Branched-chain-2-oxoacid decarboxylase =

Class of enzymes

Identifiers
- EC no.: 4.1.1.72
- CAS no.: 63653-19-0

Databases
- BRENDA: enzyme data
- ExPASy: NiceZyme view
- KEGG: enzyme entry
- MetaCyc: metabolic pathway
- Rhea: reactions
- PDB structures: RCSB PDB PDBe PDBsum
- Gene Ontology: AmiGO / QuickGO
Search
- PMC: articles
- PubMed: articles
- NCBI: proteins

The enzyme branched-chain-2-oxoacid decarboxylase (EC 4.1.1.72), characterised from Bacillus subtilis catalyzes the decarboxylation of compounds such as (3S)-3-methyl-2-oxo-pentanoic acid to 2-methylbutyraldehyde and carbon dioxide:

(3S)-3-methyl-2-oxo-pentanoic acid
CO_{2}
2-methylbutyraldehyde

Thiamine pyrophosphate is used as a cofactor and the substrate is produced from amino acids such as isoleucine by transamination. The product aldehyde is a flavor component in cheeses and kombucha. The enzyme is thought to bind to arsenic as As^{3+} and this contributes to that element's toxicity to plants.

This enzyme is a lyase, specifically a carboxy-lyase, which cleave carbon-carbon bonds. The systematic name of this enzyme class is (3S)-3-methyl-2-oxopentanoate carboxy-lyase (2-methylbutanal-forming). Other names in use include branched-chain oxo acid decarboxylase, branched-chain alpha-keto acid decarboxylase, branched-chain keto acid decarboxylase, BCKA, and (3S)-3-methyl-2-oxopentanoate carboxy-lyase.
