= 3-oxoacyl-(acyl-carrier-protein) reductase =

Enzyme

3-oxoacyl-[acyl-carrier-protein] reductase
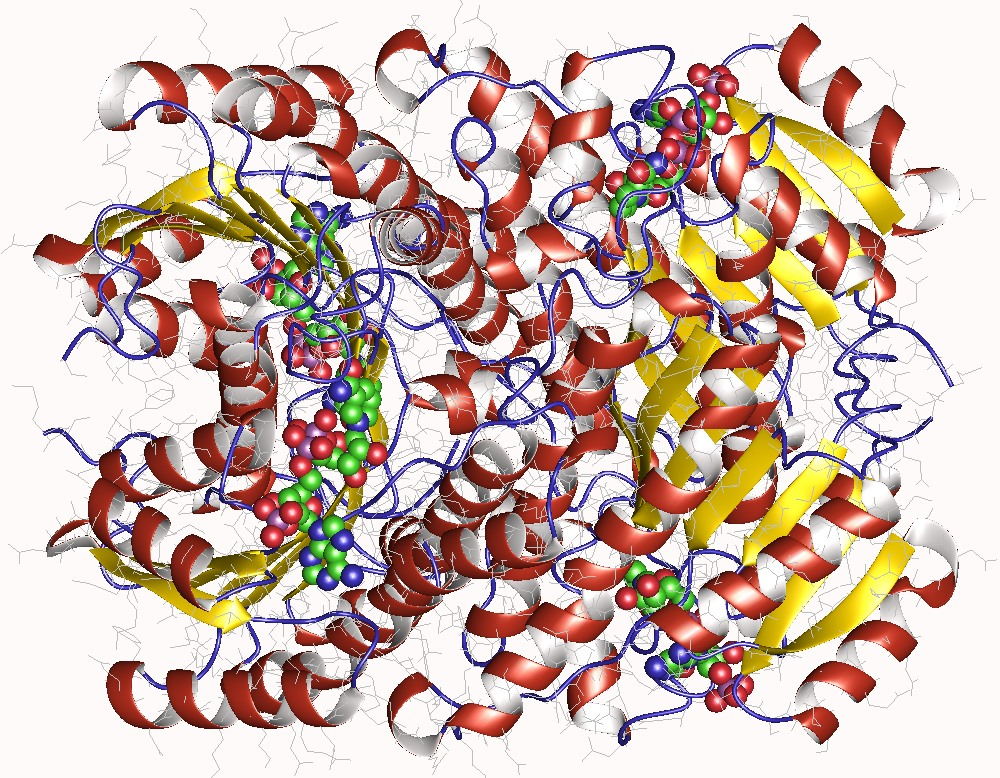
- 3-oxoacyl-[acyl-carrier-protein] reductase homotetramer, Vibrio cholerae

Identifiers
- EC no.: 1.1.1.100
- CAS no.: 37250-34-3

Databases
- BRENDA: enzyme data
- ExPASy: NiceZyme view
- KEGG: enzyme entry
- MetaCyc: metabolic pathway
- Rhea: reactions
- PDB structures: RCSB PDB PDBe PDBsum
- Gene Ontology: AmiGO / QuickGO
Search
- PMC: articles
- PubMed: articles
- NCBI: proteins

In enzymology, a 3-oxoacyl-[acyl-carrier-protein] reductase (EC 1.1.1.100) is an enzyme that catalyzes the chemical reaction

3-oxoacyl-[acyl-carrier-protein](ACP) + NADPH + H^{+} $\rightleftharpoons$ (3R)-3-hydroxyacyl-[acyl-carrier-protein](ACP) + NADP^{+}

This enzyme belongs to the family of oxidoreductases, specifically those acting on the CH-OH group as hydride donor with NAD^{+} or NADP^{+} as hydride acceptor. The systematic name of this enzyme class is (3R)-3-hydroxyacyl-[acyl-carrier-protein]:NADP^{+} oxidoreductase. Other names in common use include beta-ketoacyl-[acyl-carrier protein](ACP) reductase, beta-ketoacyl acyl carrier protein (ACP) reductase, beta-ketoacyl reductase, beta-ketoacyl thioester reductase, beta-ketoacyl-ACP reductase, beta-ketoacyl-acyl carrier protein reductase, 3-ketoacyl acyl carrier protein reductase, 3-ketoacyl ACP reductase, NADPH-specific 3-oxoacyl-[acylcarrier protein]reductase, and 3-oxoacyl-[ACP]reductase. This enzyme participates in fatty acid biosynthesis and polyunsaturated fatty acid biosynthesis.

== Structural studies ==
As of late 2007, 21 structures have been solved for this class of enzymes, with PDB accession codes PDB: 1I01, PDB: 1O5I, PDB: 1Q7B, PDB: 1Q7C, PDB: 1ULS, PDB: 1UZL, PDB: 1UZM, PDB: 1UZN, PDB: 2A4K, PDB: 2B4Q, PDB: 2C07, PDB: 2FR0, PDB: 2FR1, PDB: 2NM0, PDB: 2NTN, PDB: 2P68, PDB: 2PFF, PDB: 2PH3, PDB: 2PNF, PDB: 2UVD, and PDB: 2Z5L.
