= Fatty acid synthesis =

Biochemical process in which fatty acids are derived from acetyl-CoA and NADPH

Fatty Acid Synthesis
- Fatty acids are synthesized via multi-step reactions involving acetyl-CoA, malonyl-CoA, and Fatty Acid Synthase (FAS).

Biochemical Reaction
- Part of: Cell
- Located: Cytoplasm, Mitochondria
- Category: Metabolic Pathway

Central Functions
- Regulation of Lipid Metabolism
- Production of Cell Membrane Components
- Production of Cell Signaling Molecules
- Cellular Energy Homeostasis

Key Enzymes
- Acetyl-CoA Carboxylase (ACC)
- Fatty Acid Synthase (FAS)
- Coenzyme A (CoA)
- Acyl Carrier Protein (ACP)

Primary Products
- Saturated Fatty Acids
- Monounsaturated Fatty Acids
- Polyunsaturated Fatty Acids

Used to Produce
- Phospholipids, Glycerolipids, Sphingolipids
- Triacylglycerols, Cholesteryl Esters
- Eicosanoids, Prostaglandins

Discovered
- 1813: Michel Eugene Chevreul; Introduces the term "fatty acid"
- 1840: Justus von Liebig; Proposes "sugar-to-fat" conversion
- 1953: Jim Mead & Colleagues; Uncover pathways for elongation of polyunsaturated fatty acids
- 1965: Diederik Nugteren; Uncovers enzymatic chain elongation of fatty acids in rat liver microsomes
- 1965: Diederik Nugteren; Postulates acetyl-CoA carboxylase as the rate-limiting step in elongation
- 1979: Bernert & Sprecher; Purifies β-hydroxyacyl-CoA dehydrase for the first time
- 1990: Mikolajczyk & Brody; Demonstrate de novo fatty acid synthesis in mitochondria
- 1997: Millar & Kunst; Uncover enzymes involved in very-long chain fatty acid biosynthesis
- 2025: Kim & Colleagues; Develop a method for direct quantification of mitochondrial fatty acid synthesis products

In biochemistry, fatty acid synthesis is the process by which fatty acids, the fundamental building blocks of fats, are derived from metabolic intermediates through the coordinated actions of enzymes.

Fatty acids (FAs), comprise a large group of chemically heterogeneous compounds. Each fatty acid is composed of a carboxylic acid attached to an aliphatic hydrocarbon chain, of which is either saturated or unsaturated. FAs prove crucial within the cell, as these molecules serve as the indispensable building blocks of cell membranes. FAs also provide dense, long-term energy sources for the cell, and the biosynthetic production of FAs is essential for maintaining cellular homeostasis.

Fatty acid biosynthetic pathways are highly evolutionarily conserved across species, though different enzymes and genetic organizations have evolved to reach similarities about the general pathway. In both animals and fungi, all fatty acid synthetic pathways utilize one multifunctional protein complex, type-I fatty acid synthase (FAS), which is divided into the type-Ia FAS (in fungi) and the type-Ib FAS (in animals). In most prokaryotes and in the plastids of plants, fatty acid synthesis occurs via type-II fatty acid synthase (FAS).

Fatty acid synthesis occurs in the cytosol, where there is a high NADPH/NADP+ ratio available to drive the reactions forward. FAs can be further processed in the endoplasmic reticulum, where they are joined to a glycerol backbone in groups of three to form triacylglycerol (TAG), or in pairs (with the addition of a polar head group on the C1 of glycerol) to form a phospholipid.

Fatty acids are classified according to the number of carbon double bonds present about the aliphatic hydrocarbon chain. Saturated fatty acids have no double bonds. Monounsaturated fatty acids have one double bond, while polyunsaturated fatty acids have two or more double bonds present about the hydrocarbon chain.

Saturated fatty acids are a primary constituent of glycerolipids, as well as the phospholipids and sphingolipids found in cellular membranes. Common saturated fatty acids include palmitic acid, butyric acid, and stearic acid, all of which contribute to LDL cholesterol levels and increase the risk of obesity, heart disease, and stroke. Monounsaturated fatty acids are also primary constituent of glycerolipids and cellular membrane structures. Monounsaturated fatty acids include oleic acid, palmitoleic acid, and vaccenic acid, which help lower LDL cholesterol and reduce the risk of heart disease and stroke. Polyunsaturated fatty acids are found in the phospholipids of cell membranes, and are also known to act as precursors for a variety of lipid signaling molecules. Common polyunsaturated fatty acids include the essential omega-3 and omega-6 fatty acids, which are crucial for brain, heart, and immune health.

While the degree of saturation is used to differentiate fatty acids and their chemical composition, the length of the aliphatic hydrocarbon chain also influences fatty acids and their biological roles. Carbon chain lengths can vary greatly within each class of fatty acids, with some having as few as 12-carbons (i.e., dodecanoic acid) and others having as many as 30-carbons (i.e., triacontanoic acid). Fatty acid chain length is known to shape several biophysical properties of the cellular membrane, such as membrane fluidity, microdomain formation, and the assembly of membrane-associated signaling platforms. Chain length can also alter cellular susceptibility to death or survival through modulation of membrane properties.

Interestingly, mammals are unable to synthesize polyunsaturated fatty acids de novo. While mammalian cells express the enzymes necessary for the conversion of carbohydrate-derived and protein-derived carbons into saturated and monounsaturated fatty acids, they lack the desaturase enzymes required for production of the limiting-reagent in polyunsaturated fatty acid synthesis. Thus, polyunsaturated fatty acids are considered essential, and must be acquired through dietary consumption.

Thus, for all non-essential fatty acids, FA synthesis occurs de novo, wherein fats are derived from simple precursors like carbohydrates (i.e., glucose) via acetyl-CoA. De novo fatty acid synthesis primarily occurs in the cytosol of hepatocytes (i.e., in the liver) and adipocytes (i.e., in adipose tissue or fat). Fatty acids are also synthesized de novo within tissues with high metabolic demands, such as mammary glands (i.e., for milk fat production during lactation), immune cells (i.e., macrophages, B cells, T cells), and even within the brain (i.e., during neurogenesis). Notably, although saturated and monounsaturated fatty acids are considered non-essential, both saturated and monounsaturated fatty acids can be synthesized de novo alongside polyunsaturated fatty acids.

De novo fatty acid synthesis is separated into two groups based on the compartment wherein fatty acid synthesis takes place: cytosolic fatty acid synthesis (FAS/FASI) and mitochondrial fatty acid synthesis (mtFAS/mtFASII).

== Fatty Acid Nomenclature ==
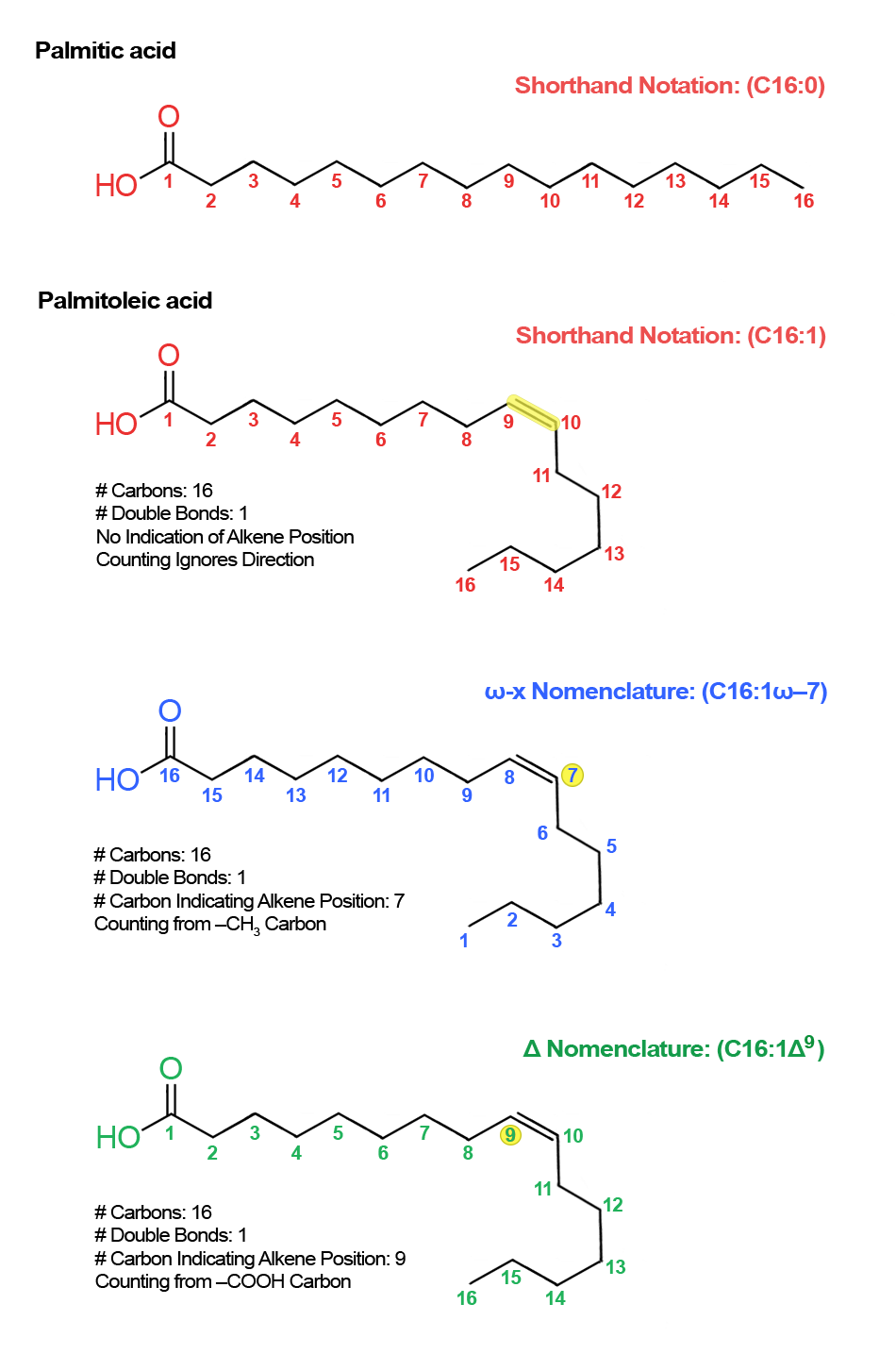
Example 1. Palmitoleic Acid Nomenclature

For palmitoleic acid (C16:1), shorthand notation (red), ω-x notation (blue), and Δ notation (green) are shown. For palmitic acid (C16:0), only shorthand notation (red) need be shown.

Generally, fatty acids (FAs) can be defined as organic compounds containing a carboxyl group (–COOH) at one end of an aliphatic hydrocarbon chain (also called the "front" end of the molecule), and a methyl group (–CH_{3}) at the opposite end (also called the "methyl" end of the molecule). Fatty acid chains commonly contain anywhere from 4 to 24 carbon atoms, but they are known to reach up to 44 carbon atoms in length. Fatty acid chains typically contain an even number of carbon atoms (i.e., 10, 12, 16) and a linear structure about the acyl chain, though both odd-numbered and branched fatty acids also exist.

Fatty acids can be categorized according to the degree of saturation (number of double bonds) present about the aliphatic hydrocarbon chain. Saturated fatty acids (SFAs) have no double bonds. Monounsaturated fatty acids (MUFAs) have one double bond, while polyunsaturated fatty acids (PUFAs) have two or more double bonds present about the acyl chain.

Two discrete nomenclature systems are used for describing fatty acids: omega (ω–x) nomenclature and delta (Δ) nomenclature, in addition to simple common names. Within the fields of medicine and nutrition, both common names and omega nomenclature are frequently used to discuss fatty acids. In biochemistry and lipids research, fatty acid common names, omega nomenclature, and delta nomenclature are all widely used, but delta nomenclature is more typically seen in discussions on specific fatty acids.

Additionally, common fatty acid names are often denoted alongside a shorthand notation (i.e., palmitic acid (C16:0)). Herein, the total number of carbons about the fatty acid is listed prior to the total number of double bonds present within the molecule, and is generally formatted as is seen in Example 1. for palmitic acid (C16:0) and palmitoleic acid (C16:1).

=== (ω-x) Nomenclature System ===
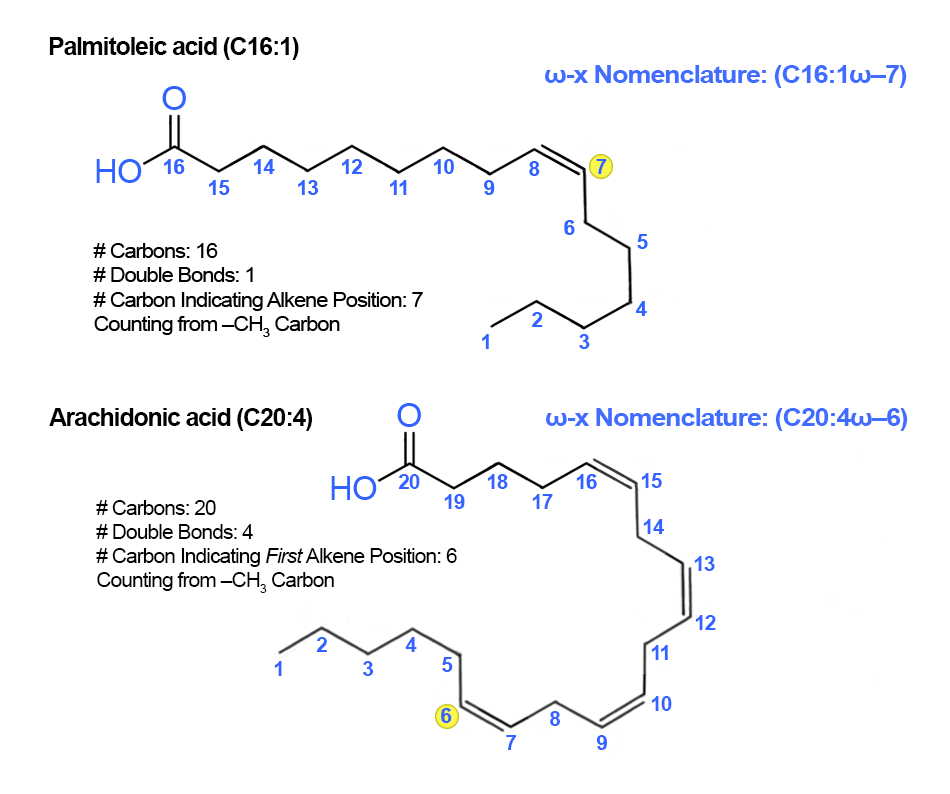
Example 2. Omega Nomenclature for Fatty Acids
For palmitoleic acid (C16:1) and arachidonic acid (C20:4),
ω–x nomenclature are shown in blue.

In biochemistry, the most prevalent, internationally accepted system of nomenclature for fatty acids is defined by the International Union of Pure and Applied Chemistry (IUPAC). Herein, the ω-x system (also known as the omega x or n-x system) establishes that fatty acids can be identified through the following formation: C:Dω–x

where C is the total number of carbons, D is the number of double bonds, and ω–x indicates the position of the first double bond, counting from the –CH_{3} end of the fatty acid. The ω–x system curbs ambiguity regarding SFAs and MUFAs, as it specifically denotes both the carbon and unsaturation numbers, as well as the location of the double bond (i.e., for MUFAs). Equally, ω–x nomenclature is widely used for PUFAs, particularly for those wherein two consecutive double bonds are consistently separated by a methylene group (–CH2–). However, several PUFAs contain double bonds that are not always interrupted by a methylene group, and thus the ω–x system fails to establish the specific position of all double bonds about PUFA chains. As such, these atypical PUFAs are generically referred to as "non-methylene interrupted" (NMI) fatty acids, and are commonly found in lipids from marine invertebrates.

=== (Δ) Nomenclature System ===
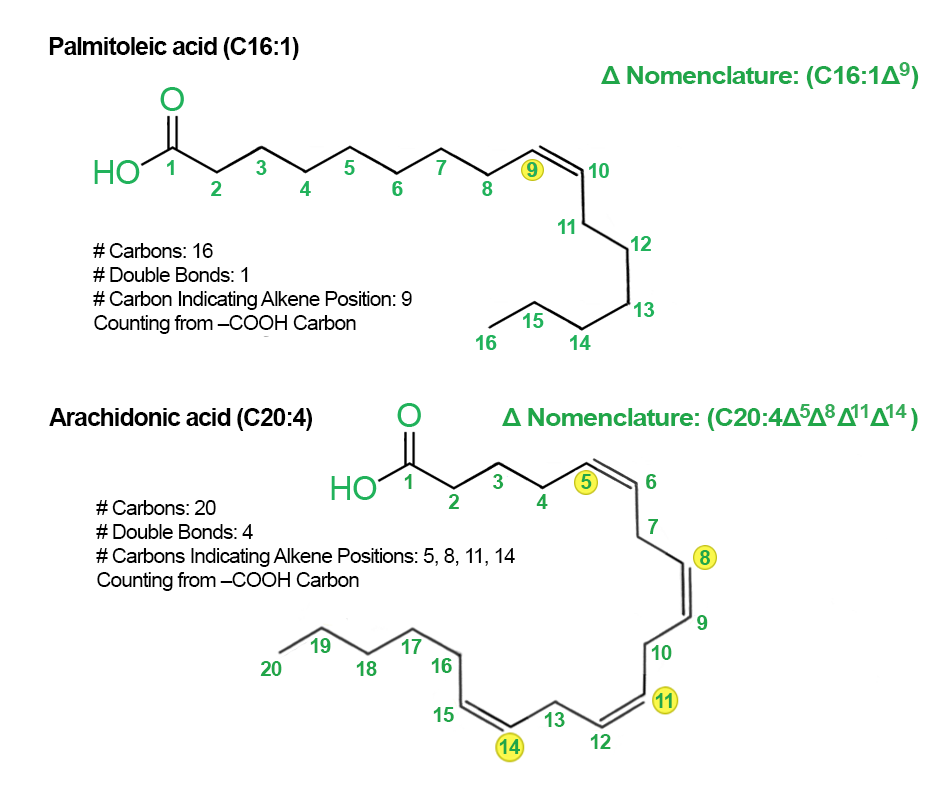
Example 3. Delta Nomenclature for Fatty Acids
For palmitoleic acid (C16:1) and arachidonic acid (C20:4),
Δ nomenclature is shown in green.

Using fundamental principles established by IUPAC, the delta (Δ) system for lipid notation was developed by researchers within the mid-20th century, to address the need for distinction between fatty acids with the same acyl chain length but different double bond positions. Thus, the Δ system defines the position of double bonds by virtue of the carboxyl (–COOH) carbon using the general formula: C:DΔ^{y}

where C is the total number of carbons, D is the number of double bonds, and Δ^{y} indicates the position of each double bond, counting from the –COOH end of the fatty acid. Unlike the omega nomenclature system, each double bond of the fatty acid must be described in the delta system.

== Cytosolic Fatty Acid Synthesis ==
While essential fatty acids (i.e., linoleic acid) are obtained exclusively through diet, all non-essential fatty acids must be synthesized de novo. Acetyl-CoA is the precursor used for fatty acid synthesis in the cytosol; therefore, fatty acid synthesis requires those reactions which produce acetyl-CoA—namely, glycolysis or amino acid metabolism. Regardless of the metabolic source of the product, all de novo lipogenesis relies on the production and availability of cytosolic acetyl-CoA, and thereafter on its conversion into malonyl-CoA.

Acetyl-CoA is generated in the mitochondria from pyruvate molecules derived from glucose via glycolysis. Within the mitochondria, acetyl-CoA typically combines with oxaloacetate and serves as a substrate for the synthesis of citrate as part of the well known citric acid cycle. Notably, the inner mitochondrial membrane is impermeable to acetyl-CoA, and as such, a specialized shuttle system must be used to import acetyl-CoA into the cytosol for fatty acid production. This process, known as the citrate–malate shuttle, relies on the tricarboxylate transport protein to import citrate into the cytosol, where it is then split into acetyl-CoA and oxaloacetate by the enzyme ATP citrate lyase (ACL). Cytosolic acetyl-CoA is then available for use in fatty acid and cholesterol synthesis, but oxaloacetate must be reduced to malate in order to reenter the mitochondria. Malate dehydrogenase reduces cytosolic oxaloacetate by coupling NADH oxidation to NAD+, and malate produced by this reaction can be transported back into the mitochondria, thus completing the namesake of the citrate–malate shuttle.

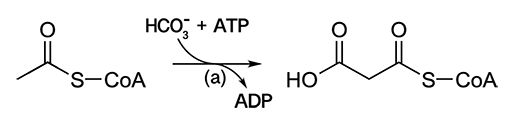
Reaction 1. Formation of Malonyl-CoA

In the first reaction of fatty acid synthesis, acetyl-CoA is irreversibly carboxylated by acetyl-CoA carboxylase (ACC) to form malonyl-CoA. The formation of malonyl-CoA is the rate-limiting step of fatty acid synthesis.

This step provides the malonyl-CoA substrate for use in fatty acid synthesis.

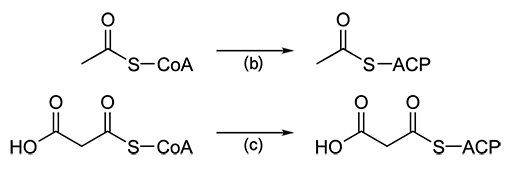
Reaction 2. Formation of Acetyl-ACP and Malonyl-ACP

In the second reaction of fatty acid synthesis, acetyl transacylase and malonyl transacylase catalyze the formation of acetyl-ACP and malonyl-ACP, respectively. The transacylase enzymes use the sulfhydryl group of ACP to release CoA and form acetyl-ACP and malonyl-ACP.

This step activates acetyl-CoA and malonyl-CoA for use in fatty acid synthesis.

Reaction 3. Condensation of Acetyl-ACP and Malonyl-ACP

During the third step of fatty acid synthesis, acetyl-ACP and malonyl-ACP undergo a condensation reaction catalyzed by β-ketoacyl-ACP synthase, which produces a four-carbon acetoacetyl-ACP molecule and one molecule of CO_{2}. The condensation reaction is shown in (c).

This is the first condensation reaction of fatty acid synthesis.

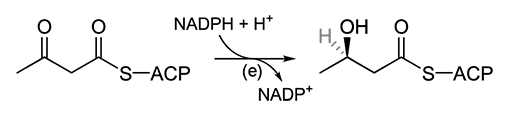
Reaction 4. Reduction of Acetoacetyl-ACP to β-hydroxyacyl-ACP

During the fourth reaction of fatty acid synthesis, acetoacetyl-ACP is reduced by 3-ketoacyl-ACP reductase to form one molecule of β-hydroxyacyl-ACP. The reaction scheme for the reduction is shown in (d). NADPH is used as the reducing agent.

This is the first reduction reaction of fatty acid synthesis.

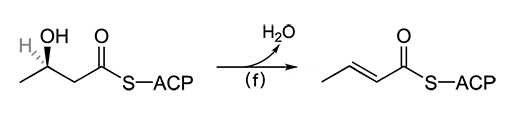
Reaction 5. Dehydration of β-hydroxyacyl-ACP to Enoyl-ACP

During the fifth reaction of fatty acid synthesis, β-hydroxyacyl-ACP undergoes a dehydration reaction catalyzed by 3-hydroxyacyl-ACP dehydratase. The reaction scheme for the dehydration is shown in (e). One molecule of water is removed from a β-hydroxyacyl intermediate to form a double bond, saturating the chain and producing enoyl-ACP.

This is the first dehydration reaction of fatty acid synthesis.

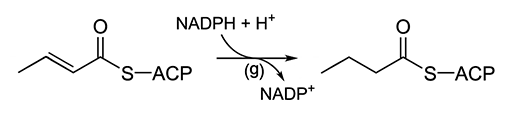
Reaction 6. Reduction of Enoyl-ACP to Butyryl-ACP

During the sixth reaction of fatty acid synthesis, enoyl-ACP is reduced by enoyl-ACP reductase to form butyryl-ACP. The reaction scheme is shown in (f). Herein, the double bond of the trans-2-enoyl-ACP molecule is reduced to a saturated acyl-ACP using NADPH as the reducing agent.

This is the second reduction reaction of fatty acid synthesis.

=== Fatty Acid Synthesis ===
Fatty acid synthesis begins in the cytosol. During the first reaction, irreversible carboxylation of acetyl-CoA to malonyl-CoA is catalyzed by the biotin-dependent enzyme acetyl-CoA carboxylase (ACC). Notably, the conversion of acetyl-CoA to malonyl-CoA is the rate-limiting step of fatty acid synthesis. Acetyl-CoA carboxylase (ACC) thus represents the rate-limiting enzyme in fatty acid synthesis; ACC activity is stimulated by increasing concentrations of cytosolic citrate, and inhibited by increasing concentrations of the fatty acid palmitate.

After malonyl-CoA becomes available by virtue of ACC, fatty acid synthase (FAS) is then able to complete a series of reactions to form the 16-carbon molecule palmitate. FAS is a complex, multifunctional protein containing seven different catalytic sites: acetyl transacylase, malonyl transacylase, β-ketoacyl synthase, β-ketoacyl carrier protein (ACP) reductase, 3-hydroxyacyl-ACP dehydratase, enoyl-ACP reductase, and thioesterase. These different enzymes are covalently linked within the FAS complex, allowing for intermediates to be handled efficiently from one active site to another without leaving the assembly. After the completion of the first reaction by ACC, fatty acid synthesis thus continues on the FAS complex.

During the second reaction of fatty acid synthesis, acetyl transacylase and malonyl transacylase catalyze the formation of acetyl-ACP and malonyl-ACP, respectively. Acetyl transacylase transfers the acetyl group of acetyl-CoA onto the sulfhydryl group of Acyl Carrier Protein (ACP), releasing CoA and forming acetyl-ACP. An equivalent reaction occurs for malonyl-CoA, in which malonyl transacylase transfers the malonyl group from malonyl-CoA to the sulfhydryl group of Acyl Carrier Protein (ACP), releasing CoA and forming malonyl-ACP. These two reactions are essential, as they prime the acetyl and malonyl groups for condensation in the subsequent chain elongation reaction step.

After the production of acetyl-ACP and malonyl-ACP, fatty acid synthesis begins to cycle through repetitions of the following reaction sequence: condensation → reduction → dehydration → reduction. Ultimately, this elongation reaction sequence repeats through 7 cycles to form one molecule of (16C) palmitate, as malonyl-CoA (the carbon donor) adds 2 carbons to the growing chain per cycle.

During the third reaction of fatty acid synthesis, acetyl-ACP and malonyl-ACP undergo a condensation reaction catalyzed by the enzyme β-ketoacyl-ACP synthase (also known as acyl-malonyl-ACP condensing enzyme), which produces the four-carbon acetoacetyl-ACP molecule and one molecule of CO_{2}. Notably, the reaction of two-carbon acetyl-ACP with three-carbon malonyl-ACP is more favorable than that of two, two-carbon acetyl-ACP molecules reacting together.

The fourth step of fatty acid elongation is the reduction of acetoacyl-ACP to β-hydroxyacyl-ACP, in a reaction catalyzed by 3-ketoacyl-ACP reductase. Herein, the electron donor NADPH is used as the reducing agent, ultimately converting the β-keto group of β-ketoacyl-ACP into the β-hydroxyl group of β-hydroxyacyl-ACP.

The fifth step of fatty acid elongation is the dehydration of β-hydroxyacyl-ACP to enoyl-ACP, in a reaction catalyzed by 3-hydroxyacyl-ACP dehydratase. 3-hydroxyacyl-ACP dehydratase removes one molecule of H_{2}O to form a double bond between the C2–C3 carbons of β-hydroxyacyl-ACP, thereby saturating the chain and producing enoyl-ACP.

The sixth step of fatty acid elongation is the reduction of enoyl-ACP to butyryl-ACP, in a reaction catalyzed by enoyl-ACP reductase. Herein, enoyl-ACP reductase reduces the C2–C3 double bond of enoyl-ACP into a saturated acyl-ACP using one molecule NADPH as the electron donor. The production of butyryl-ACP thus marks the completion of the first cycle of fatty acid elongation, and the reaction sequence thereafter repeats again (condensation → reduction → dehydration → reduction).

At the beginning of the second cycle, butyryl-ACP condenses with a molecule of malonyl-ACP, forming the six-carbon β-ketoacyl-ACP molecule and one molecule of CO_{2}. The next three reactions within the second cycle (reduction → dehydration → reduction) convert the six-carbon β-ketoacyl-ACP into a six-carbon ACP molecule, which thus marks the completion of the second cycle of fatty acid elongation, and a third cycle can thereafter begin. These elongation cycles continue (x7) until a (16C) acyl-ACP molecule is formed. Thereafter, the (16C) acyl-ACP is hydrolyzed by a thioesterase to form one molecule of palmitate and one molecule of ACP.

Stoichiometry for the synthesis of palmitate is described by the following equation:

8 Acetyl-CoA + 7 ATP + 14 NADPH + 13 H^{+} → Palmitate + 14 NADP^{+} + 8 CoA + 6 H_{2}O + 7 ADP + 7 P_{i}

Throughout the cycle, seven ATP molecules are used for the conversion of seven acetyl-CoA molecules into seven molecules of malonyl-CoA, which is used as the substrate for chain elongation. Hence, the seven molecules of malonyl-CoA are omitted from the stoichiometric equation, given that they were originally derived from acetyl-CoA.

=== Further Elongation of Palmitate ===
Palmitate produced by FAS can be used in the generation of even longer fatty acids, in a process unsurprisingly catalyzed by elongase enzymes, which lengthen palmitate to yield long chain fatty acids. Alternatively, palmitate can undergo desaturation reactions, in a process catalyzed by desaturase enzymes, which ultimately generate unsaturated fatty acids. Elongation of palmitate requires the addition of a CoA thioester to palmitate in an ATP-dependent reaction, which is catalyzed by acyl-CoA synthetase. Further elongation occurs through the subsequent additions of malonyl-CoA molecules onto palmitate, or onto other saturated or unsaturated fatty acyl-CoA substrates. These further elongation reactions are catalyzed by fatty acyl synthase enzyme, which is located on the cytosolic face of the endoplasmic reticulum (ER). Herein, these condensation reactions are driven by the decarboxylation of the additional malonyl-CoA substrates. Unlike the former elongation cycles, which produced the sixteen-carbon palmitate substrate, the further elongation of palmitate does not involve ACP and does not rely on a multifunctional enzyme (i.e., FAS).

== Regulation of Fatty Acid Synthesis ==
=== Conversion of carbohydrates into fatty acids ===
In humans, fatty acids are formed from carbohydrates predominantly in the liver and adipose tissue, as well as in the mammary glands during lactation. The pyruvate produced by glycolysis is an important intermediary in the conversion of carbohydrates into fatty acids and cholesterol. This occurs via the conversion of pyruvate into acetyl-CoA in the mitochondrion. However, this acetyl-CoA needs to be transported into cytosol where the synthesis of fatty acids and cholesterol occurs. This cannot occur directly. To obtain cytosolic acetyl-CoA, citrate (produced by the condensation of acetyl-CoA with oxaloacetate) is removed from the citric acid cycle and carried across the inner mitochondrial membrane into the cytosol. There it is cleaved by ATP citrate lyase into acetyl-CoA and oxaloacetate. The oxaloacetate can be used for gluconeogenesis (in the liver), or it can be returned into mitochondrion as malate. The cytosolic acetyl-CoA is carboxylated by acetyl-CoA carboxylase into malonyl-CoA, the first committed step in the synthesis of fatty acids.

=== Animals cannot resynthesize carbohydrates from fatty acids ===
The main fuel stored in the bodies of animals is fat. A young adult human's fat stores average between about 15–20 kg (33–44 lb), but varies greatly depending on age, sex, and individual disposition. In contrast, the human body stores only about 400 g (0.9 lb) of glycogen, of which 300 g (0.7 lb) is locked inside the skeletal muscles and is unavailable to the body as a whole. The 100 g (0.2 lb) or so of glycogen stored in the liver is depleted within one day of starvation. Thereafter the glucose that is released into the blood by the liver for general use by the body tissues, has to be synthesized from the glucogenic amino acids and a few other gluconeogenic substrates, which do not include fatty acids.

Fatty acids are broken down to acetyl-CoA by means of beta oxidation inside the mitochondria, whereas fatty acids are synthesized from acetyl-CoA outside the mitochondrion, in the cytosol. The two pathways are distinct, not only in where they occur, but also in the reactions that occur, and the substrates that are used. The two pathways are mutually inhibitory, preventing the acetyl-CoA produced by beta-oxidation from entering the synthetic pathway via the acetyl-CoA carboxylase reaction. It can also not be converted to pyruvate as the pyruvate decarboxylation reaction is irreversible. Instead it condenses with oxaloacetate, to enter the citric acid cycle. During each turn of the cycle, two carbon atoms leave the cycle as CO_{2} in the decarboxylation reactions catalyzed by isocitrate dehydrogenase and alpha-ketoglutarate dehydrogenase. Thus each turn of the citric acid cycle oxidizes an acetyl-CoA unit while regenerating the oxaloacetate molecule with which the acetyl-CoA had originally combined to form citric acid. The decarboxylation reactions occur before malate is formed in the cycle. Malate is the only substance that can be removed from the mitochondrion to enter the gluconeogenic pathway to form glucose or glycogen in the liver or any other tissue. There can therefore be no net conversion of fatty acids into glucose.

Only plants possess the enzymes to convert acetyl-CoA into oxaloacetate from which malate can be formed to ultimately be converted to glucose.

=== Regulation ===
Acetyl-CoA is formed into malonyl-CoA by acetyl-CoA carboxylase, at which point malonyl-CoA is destined to feed into the fatty acid synthesis pathway. Acetyl-CoA carboxylase is the point of regulation in saturated straight-chain fatty acid synthesis, and is subject to both phosphorylation and allosteric regulation. Regulation by phosphorylation occurs mostly in mammals, while allosteric regulation occurs in most organisms. Allosteric control occurs as feedback inhibition by palmitoyl-CoA and activation by citrate. When there are high levels of palmitoyl-CoA, the final product of saturated fatty acid synthesis, it allosterically inactivates acetyl-CoA carboxylase to prevent a build-up of fatty acids in cells. Citrate acts to activate acetyl-CoA carboxylase under high levels, because high levels indicate that there is enough acetyl-CoA to feed into the Krebs cycle and conserve energy.

High plasma levels of insulin in the blood plasma (e.g. after meals) cause the dephosphorylation of acetyl-CoA carboxylase, thus promoting the formation of malonyl-CoA from acetyl-CoA, and consequently the conversion of carbohydrates into fatty acids, while epinephrine and glucagon (released into the blood during starvation and exercise) cause the phosphorylation of this enzyme, inhibiting lipogenesis in favor of fatty acid oxidation via beta-oxidation.

== Unsaturated straight chain fatty acids ==
=== Anaerobic desaturation ===
Many bacteria use the anaerobic pathway for synthesizing unsaturated fatty acids. This pathway does not utilize oxygen and is dependent on enzymes to insert the double bond before elongation utilizing the normal fatty acid synthesis machinery. In Escherichia coli, this pathway is well understood.

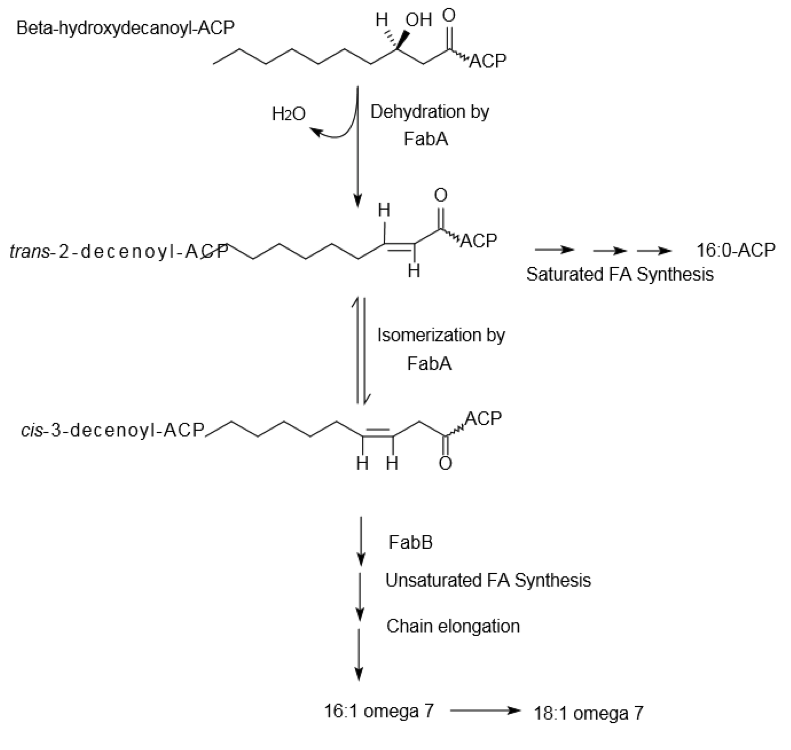
Synthesis of unsaturated fatty acids via anaerobic desaturation

- FabA is a β-hydroxydecanoyl-ACP dehydrase – it is specific for the 10-carbon saturated fatty acid synthesis intermediate (β-hydroxydecanoyl-ACP).
- FabA catalyzes the dehydration of β-hydroxydecanoyl-ACP, causing the release of water and insertion of the double bond between C7 and C8 counting from the methyl end. This creates the trans-2-decenoyl intermediate.
- Either the trans-2-decenoyl intermediate can be shunted to the normal saturated fatty acid synthesis pathway by FabB, where the double bond will be hydrolyzed and the final product will be a saturated fatty acid, or FabA will catalyze the isomerization into the cis-3-decenoyl intermediate.
- FabB is a β-ketoacyl-ACP synthase that elongates and channels intermediates into the mainstream fatty acid synthesis pathway. When FabB reacts with the cis-decenoyl intermediate, the final product after elongation will be an unsaturated fatty acid.
- The two main unsaturated fatty acids made are Palmitoleoyl-ACP (16:1ω7) and cis-vaccenoyl-ACP (18:1ω7).

Most bacteria that undergo anaerobic desaturation contain homologues of FabA and FabB. Clostridia are the main exception; they have a novel enzyme, yet to be identified, that catalyzes the formation of the cis double bond.

Regulation

This pathway undergoes transcriptional regulation by FadR and FabR. FadR is the more extensively studied protein and has been attributed bifunctional characteristics. It acts as an activator of fabA and fabB transcription and as a repressor for the β-oxidation regulon. In contrast, FabR acts as a repressor for the transcription of fabA and fabB.

=== Aerobic desaturation ===
Aerobic desaturation is the most widespread pathway for the synthesis of unsaturated fatty acids. It is utilized in all eukaryotes and some prokaryotes. This pathway utilizes desaturases to synthesize unsaturated fatty acids from full-length saturated fatty acid substrates. All desaturases require oxygen and ultimately consume NADH even though desaturation is an oxidative process. Desaturases are specific for the double bond they induce in the substrate. In Bacillus subtilis, the desaturase, Δ^{5}-Des, is specific for inducing a cis-double bond at the Δ^{5} position. Saccharomyces cerevisiae contains one desaturase, Ole1p, which induces the cis-double bond at Δ^{9}.

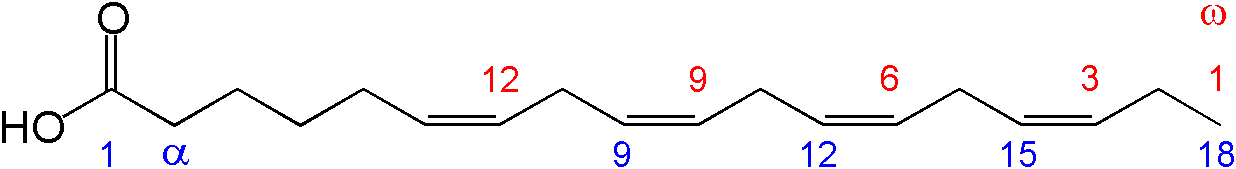
In mammals the aerobic desaturation is catalyzed by a complex of three membrane-bound enzymes (NADH-cytochrome b_{5} reductase, cytochrome b_{5}, and a desaturase). These enzymes allow molecular oxygen, O_{2}, to interact with the saturated fatty acyl-CoA chain, forming a double bond and two molecules of water, H_{2}O. Two electrons come from NADH + H^{+} and two from the single bond in the fatty acid chain. These mammalian enzymes are, however, incapable of introducing double bonds at carbon atoms beyond C-9 in the fatty acid chain. (Note: Numbering of carbon atoms The position of the carbon atoms in a fatty acid can be indicated from the COOH- (or carboxy) end, or from the -CH_{3} (or methyl) end. If indicated from the -COOH end, then the C-1, C-2, C-3,....(etc.) notation is used (blue numerals in the diagram on the right, where C-1 is the –COOH carbon). If the position is counted from the other, -CH_{3}, end then the position is indicated by the ω-n notation (numerals in red, where ω-1 refers to the methyl carbon). The positions of the double bonds in a fatty acid chain can, therefore, be indicated in two ways, using the C-n or the ω-n notation. Thus, in an 18 carbon fatty acid, a double bond between C-12 (or ω-7) and C-13 (or ω-6) is reported either as Δ^{12} if counted from the –COOH end (indicating only the "beginning" of the double bond), or as ω-6 (or omega-6) if counting from the -CH_{3} end. The "Δ" is the Greek letter "delta", which translates into "D" (for Double bond) in the Roman alphabet. Omega (ω) is the last letter in the Greek alphabet, and is therefore used to indicate the "last" carbon atom in the fatty acid chain. Since the ω-n notation is used almost exclusively to indicate the positions of the double bonds close to the -CH_{3} end in essential fatty acids, there is no necessity for an equivalent "Δ"-like notation – the use of the "ω-n" notation always refers to the position of a double bond.).) Hence mammals cannot synthesize linoleate or linolenate (which have double bonds at the C-12 (= Δ^{12}), or the C-12 and C-15 (= Δ^{12} and Δ^{15}) positions, respectively, as well as at the Δ^{9} position), nor the polyunsaturated, 20-carbon arachidonic acid that is derived from linoleate. These are all termed essential fatty acids, meaning that they are required by the organism, but can only be supplied via the diet. (Arachidonic acid is the precursor of prostaglandins which fulfill a wide variety of functions as local hormones.)

== Odd-chain fatty acids ==
Odd-chain fatty acids (OCFAs) are those fatty acids that contain an odd number of carbon atoms. The most common OCFAs are the saturated C15 and C17 derivatives, respectively pentadecanoic acid and heptadecanoic acid. The synthesis of even-chained fatty acid synthesis is done by assembling acetyl-CoA precursors, however, propionyl-CoA instead of acetyl-CoA is used as the primer for the biosynthesis of long-chain fatty acids with an odd number of carbon atoms.

Regulation

In B. subtilis, this pathway is regulated by a two-component system: DesK and DesR. DesK is a membrane-associated kinase and DesR is a transcriptional regulator of the des gene. The regulation responds to temperature; when there is a drop in temperature, this gene is upregulated. Unsaturated fatty acids increase the fluidity of the membrane and stabilize it under lower temperatures. DesK is the sensor protein that, when there is a decrease in temperature, will autophosphorylate. DesK-P will transfer its phosphoryl group to DesR. Two DesR-P proteins will dimerize and bind to the DNA promoters of the des gene and recruit RNA polymerase to begin transcription.

Pseudomonas aeruginosa

In general, both anaerobic and aerobic unsaturated fatty acid synthesis will not occur within the same system, however Pseudomonas aeruginosa and Vibrio ABE-1 are exceptions. While P. aeruginosa undergoes primarily anaerobic desaturation, it also undergoes two aerobic pathways. One pathway utilizes a Δ^{9}-desaturase (DesA) that catalyzes a double bond formation in membrane lipids. Another pathway uses two proteins, DesC and DesB, together to act as a Δ^{9}-desaturase, which inserts a double bond into a saturated fatty acid-CoA molecule. This second pathway is regulated by repressor protein DesT. DesT is also a repressor of fabAB expression for anaerobic desaturation when in presence of exogenous unsaturated fatty acids. This functions to coordinate the expression of the two pathways within the organism.

== Branched-chain fatty acids ==
Branched chain fatty acids are usually saturated and are found in two distinct families: the iso-series and anteiso-series. It has been found that Actinomycetales contain unique branch-chain fatty acid synthesis mechanisms, including that which forms tuberculostearic acid.

=== Branch-chain fatty acid synthesizing system ===
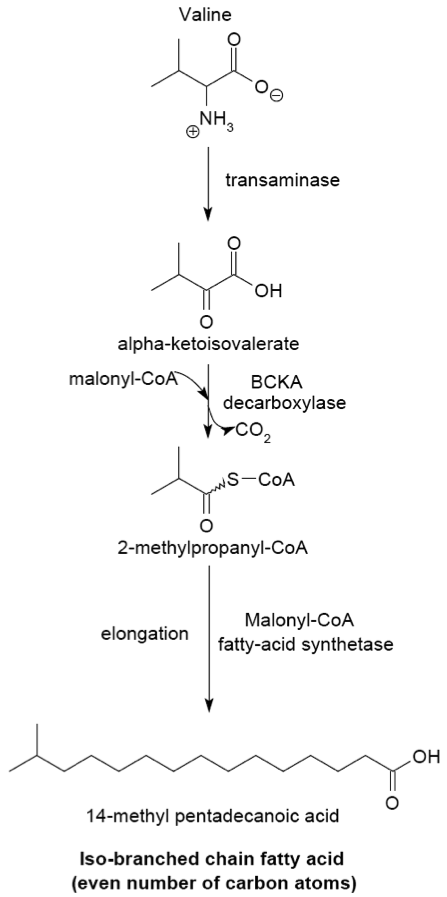
Valine primer

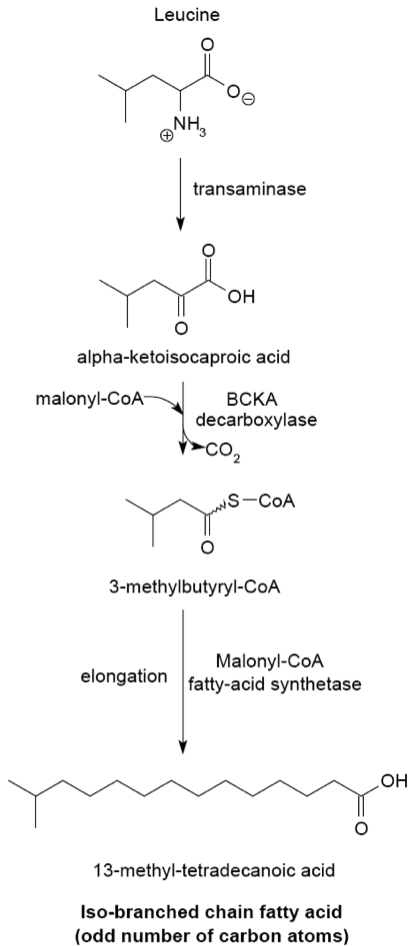
Leucine primer

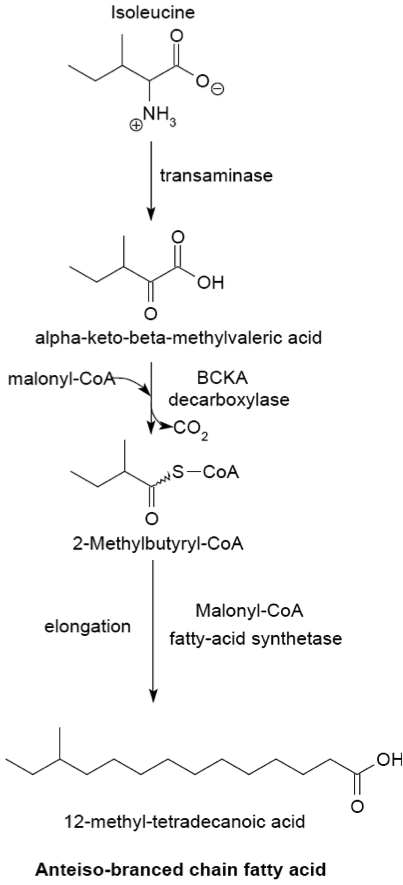
Isoleucine primer

Synthetic pathways of the branched-chain fatty acid synthesizing system given differing primers

The branched-chain fatty acid synthesizing system uses α-keto acids as primers. This system is distinct from the branched-chain fatty acid synthetase that utilizes short-chain acyl-CoA esters as primers. α-Keto acid primers are derived from the transamination and decarboxylation of valine, leucine, and isoleucine to form 2-methylpropanyl-CoA, 3-methylbutyryl-CoA, and 2-methylbutyryl-CoA, respectively. 2-Methylpropanyl-CoA primers derived from valine are elongated to produce even-numbered iso-series fatty acids such as 14-methyl-pentadecanoic (isopalmitic) acid, and 3-methylbutyryl-CoA primers from leucine may be used to form odd-numbered iso-series fatty acids such as 13-methyl-tetradecanoic acid. 2-Methylbutyryl-CoA primers from isoleucine are elongated to form anteiso-series fatty acids containing an odd number of carbon atoms such as 12-Methyl tetradecanoic acid. Decarboxylation of the primer precursors occurs through the branched-chain α-keto acid decarboxylase (BCKA) enzyme. Elongation of the fatty acid follows the same biosynthetic pathway in Escherichia coli used to produce straight-chain fatty acids where malonyl-CoA is used as a chain extender. The major end products are 12–17 carbon branched-chain fatty acids and their composition tends to be uniform and characteristic for many bacterial species.

BCKA decarboxylase and relative activities of α-keto acid substrates

The BCKA decarboxylase enzyme is composed of two subunits in a tetrameric structure (A_{2}B_{2}) and is essential for the synthesis of branched-chain fatty acids. It is responsible for the decarboxylation of α-keto acids formed by the transamination of valine, leucine, and isoleucine and produces the primers used for branched-chain fatty acid synthesis. The activity of this enzyme is much higher with branched-chain α-keto acid substrates than with straight-chain substrates, and in Bacillus species its specificity is highest for the isoleucine-derived α-keto-β-methylvaleric acid, followed by α-ketoisocaproate and α-ketoisovalerate. The enzyme's high affinity toward branched-chain α-keto acids allows it to function as the primer donating system for branched-chain fatty acid synthetase.

Substrate	BCKA activity	CO_{2} Produced (nmol/min mg)	Km (μM)	Vmax (nmol/min mg)
L-α-keto-β-methyl-valerate	100%	19.7	<1	17.8
α-Ketoisovalerate	63%	12.4	<1	13.3
α-Ketoisocaproate	38%	7.4	<1	5.6
Pyruvate	25%	4.9	51.1	15.2

Factors affecting chain length and pattern distribution

α-Keto acid primers are used to produce branched-chain fatty acids that, in general, are between 12 and 17 carbons in length. The proportions of these branched-chain fatty acids tend to be uniform and consistent among a particular bacterial species but may be altered due to changes in malonyl-CoA concentration, temperature, or heat-stable factors (HSF) present. All of these factors may affect chain length, and HSFs have been demonstrated to alter the specificity of BCKA decarboxylase for a particular α-keto acid substrate, thus shifting the ratio of branched-chain fatty acids produced. An increase in malonyl-CoA concentration has been shown to result in a larger proportion of C17 fatty acids produced, up until the optimal concentration (≈20μM) of malonyl-CoA is reached. Decreased temperatures also tend to shift the fatty-acid distribution slightly toward C17 fatty-acids in Bacillus species.

=== Branch-chain fatty acid synthase ===
This system functions similarly to the branch-chain fatty acid synthesizing system, however it uses short-chain carboxylic acids as primers instead of alpha-keto acids. In general, this method is used by bacteria that do not have the ability to perform the branch-chain fatty acid system using alpha-keto primers. Typical short-chain primers include isovalerate, isobutyrate, and 2-methyl butyrate. In general, the acids needed for these primers are taken up from the environment; this is often seen in ruminal bacteria.

The overall reaction is:

Isobutyryl-CoA + 6 malonyl-CoA +12 NADPH + 12H^{+} → Isopalmitic acid + 6 CO_{2} 12 NADP + 5 H_{2}O + 7 CoA

The difference between (straight-chain) fatty acid synthase and branch-chain fatty acid synthase is substrate specificity of the enzyme that catalyzes the reaction of acyl-CoA to acyl-ACP.

== Omega-alicyclic fatty acids ==
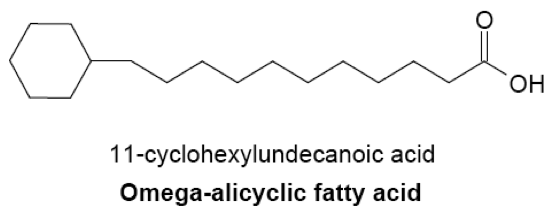

Omega-alicyclic fatty acids typically contain an omega-terminal propyl or butyryl cyclic group and are some of the major membrane fatty acids found in several species of bacteria. The fatty acid synthetase used to produce omega-alicyclic fatty acids is also used to produce membrane branched-chain fatty acids. In bacteria with membranes composed mainly of omega-alicyclic fatty acids, the supply of cyclic carboxylic acid-CoA esters is much greater than that of branched-chain primers. The synthesis of cyclic primers is not well understood but it has been suggested that mechanism involves the conversion of sugars to shikimic acid which is then converted to cyclohexylcarboxylic acid-CoA esters that serve as primers for omega-alicyclic fatty acid synthesis

=== Tuberculostearic acid synthesis ===
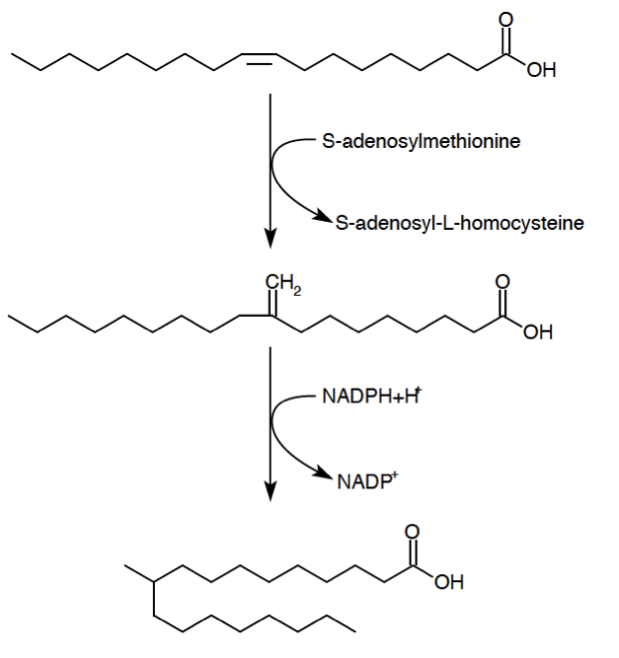
Mechanism of the synthesis of tuberculostearic acid

Tuberculostearic acid (D-10-Methylstearic acid) is a saturated fatty acid that is known to be produced by Mycobacterium spp. and two species of Streptomyces. It is formed from the precursor oleic acid (a monounsaturated fatty acid). After oleic acid is esterified to a phospholipid, S-adenosyl-methionine donates a methyl group to the double bond of oleic acid. This methylation reaction forms the intermediate 10-methylene-octadecanoyal. Successive reduction of the residue, with NADPH as a cofactor, results in 10-methylstearic acid

== Mitochondrial fatty acid synthesis ==
Although fatty acid synthesis in eukaryotes is traditionally considered a cytosolic process (FAS/FASI), a distinct de novo mitochondrial pathway (mtFAS/mtFASII) also exists, that is orthologous to the bacterial FAS II system. First described in 1990 in Neurospora crassa, this conserved pathway has since been shown to be essential for mitochondrial biogenesis and cellular respiration. Accordingly, mitochondrial fatty acid synthesis is required for embryonic survival in mammals and for respiratory growth in yeast.

=== Pathway ===
Mitochondrial fatty acid synthesis pathway

The mtFAS pathway takes place in the mitochondrial matrix and consists of at least six separate enzymes, each encoded by its own gene. This sets it apart from cytosolic fatty acid synthesis, where the multifunctional enzyme fatty acid synthase (FASN) contains all enzymatic activities within a single polypeptide chain and is encoded by a single gene. Despite this structural difference, mtFAS and cytosolic fatty acid synthesis use the same chemistry to build fatty acids.

The mitochondrial acyl carrier protein (mtACP) serves as a scaffold for fatty acyl chains but requires prior phosphopantetheinylation by AASDHPPT to convert it from the inactive apo to the active holo form. This activation represents the first step of mtFAS and introduces a 4'-phosphopantetheine group, which provides the thiol group to which the fatty acyl chain is covalently attached and subsequently elongated, while also functioning as a flexible swinging arm. This allows the fatty acyl chain to swing out of its hydrophobic pocket within mtACP and enter those of interacting proteins. Malonyl-CoA provides the substrate for mtFAS and is generated in mitochondria from acetyl-CoA by mtACC1 (a mitochondrial isoform of acetyl-CoA carboxylase 1) and from malonate by acyl-CoA synthetase family member 3 (ACSF3). However, the precise mitochondrial source of malonyl-CoA remains under debate. The malonyl group is transferred from malonyl-CoA to mtACP by malonyl-CoA:ACP transacylase (MCAT), forming malonyl-mtACP.

The actual chain elongation occurs through condensation between malonyl-mtACP and the growing acyl-mtACP (with acetyl-mtACP in the first round) by 3-oxoacyl-ACP synthase (OXSM), releasing CO_{2} and extending the chain by two carbons. Next, the newly extended fatty acyl chain on mtACP (3-ketoacyl-mtACP) undergoes reduction by the mitochondrial 3-ketoacyl-ACP reductase (mtKAR; composed of HSD17B8 and CBR4), dehydration by 3-hydroxyacyl-ACP dehydratase 2 (HTD2), and a final reduction by trans-2-enoyl-CoA reductase (MECR). The last three steps restore the fatty acyl chain to its saturated state prior to condensation, making it available for the next elongation cycle. NADPH, the electron donor required for the reduction steps, fuels the mtFAS pathway and is derived from NADP^{+} produced by NADK2.

These steps repeat until the required chain length is reached, generating mtACP-bound fatty acyl chains ranging from C2 to C16. Since no mitochondrial acyl-mtACP thioesterase has been identified in any animal species, the final products of mtFAS remain bound to mtACP rather than being released as free fatty acids.

=== Function ===
Mitochondrial fatty acid synthesis plays a crucial role in cellular energy metabolism by generating octanoyl‑ACP (C8), which serves as the direct precursor for lipoic acid biosynthesis. Lipoic acid is an essential cofactor covalently attached to specific lysine residues on target enzymes in a process called lipoylation. This post‑translational modification is essential for the activity of key mitochondrial enzyme complexes—namely, the pyruvate dehydrogenase complex (PDC), the α‑ketoglutarate dehydrogenase complex (OGDC), the 2-oxoadipate dehydrogenase complex (2‑OADHC), the branched‑chain α‑ketoacid dehydrogenase complex (BCKDC), and the glycine cleavage system (GCS).

In parallel, mtFAS and its acyl‑ACP products provide a metabolic feedback mechanism, regulating mitochondrial acetyl‑CoA consumption and thereby integrating lipid synthesis with broader metabolic control.

Beyond octanoyl‑ACP, mtFAS also produces longer‑chain acyl‑ACP species such as myristoyl‑ACP (C14) and palmitoyl‑ACP (C16), which interact with members of the leucine‑tyrosine‑arginine motif (LYRM) protein family. These LYRM proteins are vital for the correct assembly and stability of the electron‑transport chain (ETC) complexes and for iron–sulfur (Fe–S) cluster biogenesis within mitochondria.

In addition to these enzymatic and structural roles, mtFAS has also been implicated as a mediator of intracellular signal transduction. This is supported by observations that the levels of bioactive lipids—such as lysophospholipids and sphingolipids—correlate with mtFAS activity. For instance, knockdown of ACP reduces ceramide levels, whereas loss of the terminal mtFAS enzyme MECR results in ceramide accumulation.

Importantly, mtFAS function extends to the regulation of immune cell metabolism. CRISPR/Cas9 screens have identified mtFAS genes—especially Mecr, Mcat, and Oxsm—as key regulators of T cell metabolism. While MECR is not required for naive T cell maintenance, its loss in activated T cells impairs proliferation, survival, and differentiation. MECR deficiency disrupts mitochondrial respiration, alters TCA cycle activity, and increases ferroptosis sensitivity, ultimately reducing T cell fitness and inflammatory capacity.

=== Diseases ===
Defects in mtFAS enzymes are associated with the following diseases:

- ACSF3: Combined malonic and methylmalonic aciduria (CMAMMA)
- MCAT: Optic atrophy 15 (OPA15)
- MECR: Mitochondrial enoyl-CoA reductase protein-associated neurodegeneration (MEPAN syndrome)

== Comparison of cytosolic and mitochondrial fatty acid synthesis ==
In the following, similarities and differences between cytosolic and mitochondrial fatty acid synthesis are shown:

Feature		Cytosolic fatty acid synthesis (FAS/FASI)	Mitochondrial fatty acid synthesis (mtFAS/mtFASII)
Place of synthesis		Cytosol	Mitochondrial matrix
Enzyme system		FAS type I (multifunctional enzyme)	FAS type II (single enzymes)
Regulation	Key enzyme	Acetyl-CoA carboxylase	Unknown
Regulation	Activation	Allosteric: citrate Hormonal: insulin	Unknown
Regulation	Inhibition	Allosteric: palmitoyl-CoA Hormonal: glucagon, cortisol, adrenaline, noradrenaline	Unknown
Primer		Acetyl-CoA (from mitochondria via citrate–malate shuttle)	Acetyl-CoA (directly present in the matrix)
Extender units		Malonyl-CoA (from carboxylation of acetyl-CoA)	Malonyl-CoA (mainly from the carboxylation of acetyl-CoA, but also from the thioesterification of malonate)
Cofactors	Reducing agent	NADPH	NADPH (derived from NADP^{+} produced by NADK2)
Cofactors	Other	ATP, biotin (both for conversion to malonyl-CoA)	ATP, biotin (both for conversion to malonyl-CoA)
Acyl-ACP thioesterase		Available in cytosol	None known in mitochondria
End product(s)		Mainly palmitate (C16:0)	mtACP-bound fatty acyl chains (C2–C16)
Function		Lipid storage, energy balance, membrane structure	Precursors for cofactors such as lipoic acid (for PDH complex, αKGDH complex, 2-oxoadipate dehydrogenase complex, BCKDH complex and glycine cleavage system); assembly of the electron transport chain (ETC); iron-sulfur (FeS) cluster biogenesis; role in ceramide metabolism
Participation in lipid synthesis		Central role in de novo lipogenesis	Supplementary role only
Phylogenetic similarity		Eukaryote-specific	Bacteria-like (evolutionary conserved)

== See also ==
- Essential fatty acid
- Fatty acid metabolism
- Fatty acid synthase
- ThYme (database) (2010)
