= Combination reaction =

Chemical reaction combining substances into new compounds

A direct combination reaction (also known as a synthesis reaction) is a reaction where two or more elements or compounds (reactants) combine to form a single compound (product). Such reactions are represented by equations of the following form: X + Y → XY (A+B → AB). The combination of two or more elements to form one compound is called a combination reaction. In other words, when two or more elements or compounds react so as to form one single compound, then the chemical reaction that takes place is called a combination reaction. | a)- Between elements | C + O_{2} → CO_{2} | Carbon completely burnt in oxygen yields carbon dioxide |- | b) Between compounds | CaO + H_{2}O → Ca(OH)_{2} | Calcium oxide (lime) combined with water gives calcium hydroxide (slaked lime) |- | c) Between elements and compounds | 2CO + O_{2} → 2CO_{2} | Oxygen combines with carbon monoxide, And carbon dioxide is formed. |}

There is no specific number of reactants in a combination reaction.

Combination reactions are usually exothermic because when the bond forms between the reactants, heat is released. For example, barium metal and fluorine gas will combine in a highly exothermic reaction to form the salt barium fluoride:

                              Ba + F2 → BaF2

Another example is magnesium oxide combining with carbon dioxide to produce magnesium carbonate.

                              MgO + CO2 → MgCO3

Another example is iron combining with sulfur to produce iron(II) sulfide.

                              Fe + S → FeS

When a combination reaction occurs between a metal and a non-metal the product is an ionic solid. An example could be lithium reacting with sulfur to give lithium sulfide. When magnesium burns in air, the atoms of the metal combine with the gas oxygen to produce magnesium oxide. This specific combination reaction produces the bright flame generated by flares.

Combination reactions can also occur in other situations when the two products do not have the same ionic charge. In such a situation, different quantities of each reactant must be used. To denote this in a chemical equation, a coefficient is added to one or more of the reactants so that the total ionic charge of each reactant is the same. For example, Iron (III) Oxide is formed by the following equation: $\ce{4Fe + 3 O2 -> 2Fe2O3}$. This is because in this case, Iron has a charge of 3+ while each Oxygen atom in $\ce{O2}$ has a charge of 2-. Oxygen Gas ($\ce{O2}$) must be used instead of elemental oxygen ($\ce{O}$) because elemental oxygen is a free radical that is unstable and combines with other oxygen atoms to form $\ce{O2}$.

Another example natural conditions. Likewise, the Hydrogen atoms should be in the form $\ce{H2}$ because $\ce{H}$ is an unstable free radical not commonly found in nature; the chemical equation $\ce{2H + O2 -> H2O}$ is also generally impossible under natural conditions. There are some types of combination reactions

(a) Combination reactions between two elements.

(b) Combination reactions between two compounds.

(c) Combination reactions between an element and a compound.

In all the above reactions, one single compound is formed. For example,

(i) Combination Reaction Between two Elements

a) Hydrogen reacts with oxygen to form water i.e Combustion of Hydrogen forms Water (do note that this reaction is an exothermic one).

    
  
    
      
        
          2
          
          
            H
            
              2
            
            
              
            
          
          
            (
            g
            )
          
          +
          
            O
            
              2
            
            
              
            
          
          ⟶
          2
          
          
            H
            
              2
            
            
              
            
          
          O
          
            (
            l
            )
          
        
      
    
    {\displaystyle {\ce {2H2(g) + O2 -> 2H2O(l)}}}
  
 + heat

b) Hydrogen reacts with chlorine to form Hydrogen chloride(also known as hydrochloric acid)

    
  
    
      
        
          
            H
            
              2
            
            
              
            
          
          
            (
            g
            )
          
          +
          
            Cl
            
              2
            
            
              
            
          
          
            (
            g
            )
          
          ⟶
          2
          
          HCl
          
            (
            g
            )
          
        
      
    
    {\displaystyle {\ce {H2(g) + Cl2(g) -> 2HCl(g)}}}
  

(ii) Combination Reaction Between two Compound

a) Calcium oxide (quick lime) reacts with water to form calcium hydroxide (stalked lime)

    
  
    
      
        
          CaO
          
            (
            s
            )
          
          +
          
            H
            
              2
            
            
              
            
          
          O
          
            (
            l
            )
          
          ⟶
          Ca
          
            
              (
              OH
              )
            
            
              2
            
            
              
            
          
        
      
    
    {\displaystyle {\ce {CaO(s) + H2O(l) -> Ca(OH)2}}}
  

Here is another example of synthesis reaction or direct combination reaction, in this there are three reactants and they form a single product .

- Nitrogen reacts with water and oxygen to form ammonium nitrate .

$\ce{2N2(g) + 4H2O(l) + O2(g) -> 2NH4NO3(s)}$
