= Meldrum's acid =

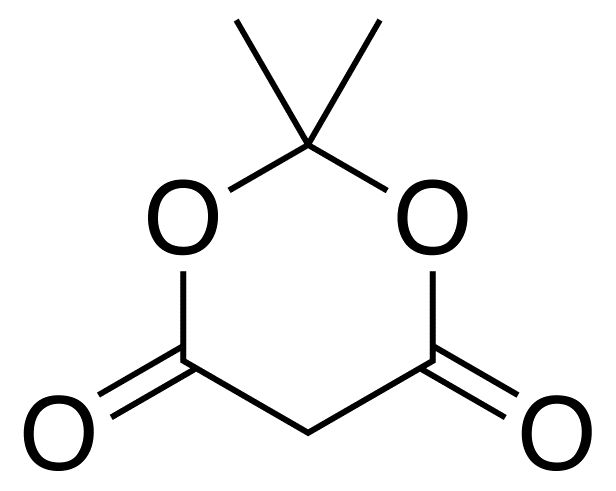
- Meldrum's Acid

Names
- Preferred IUPAC name 2,2-Dimethyl-1,3-dioxane-4,6-dione
- Other names Isopropylidene malonate

Identifiers
CAS Number	2033-24-1
3D model (JSmol)	Interactive image
ChemSpider	15418
ECHA InfoCard	100.016.358
EC Number	217-992-8
PubChem CID	16249
UNII	DD139RP1SC
CompTox Dashboard (EPA)	DTXSID7051846
- InChI: InChI=1S/C6H8O4/c1-6(2)9-4(7)3-5(8)10-6/h3H2,1-2H3 Key: GXHFUVWIGNLZSC-UHFFFAOYSA-N; InChI=1/C6H8O4/c1-6(2)9-4(7)3-5(8)10-6/h3H2,1-2H3 Key: GXHFUVWIGNLZSC-UHFFFAOYAM; InChI=1/C6H8O4/c1-6(2)9-4(7)3-5(8)10-6/h3H2,1-2H3 Key: GXHFUVWIGNLZSC-UHFFFAOYAM
- SMILES: O=C1OC(OC(=O)C1)(C)C

Properties
Chemical formula	C_{6}H_{8}O_{4}
Molar mass	144.126 g·mol^{−1}
Appearance	beige solid
Odor	odorless
Melting point	94 to 95 °C (201 to 203 °F; 367 to 368 K) (decomposes)
Solubility in water	soluble
Acidity (pK_{a})	4.97

Hazards
- GHS labelling
Pictograms	(GHS07: Exclamation mark)
Signal word	Warning
NFPA 704 (fire diamond)	2 1 1
Flash point	>365 °C (689 °F; 638 K)
- Lethal dose or concentration (LD, LC)
LD_{50} (median dose)	>5000 mg/kg (oral, rat)
- Except where otherwise noted, data are given for materials in their standard state (at 25 °C [77 °F], 100 kPa). verify (what is ?) Infobox references

Meldrum's acid or 2,2-dimethyl-1,3-dioxane-4,6-dione is an organic compound with formula C_{6}H_{8}O_{4}. Its molecule has a heterocyclic core with four carbon and two oxygen atoms; the formula can also be written as [−O−C(CH_{3})_{2}−O−(C=O)−CH_{2}−(C=O)−].

It is a crystalline colorless solid that is sparingly soluble in water and which decomposes on heating to carbon dioxide, acetone, and a ketene. Its synthesis was first reported in 1908 by Andrew Norman Meldrum, for whom it is named. Meldrum incorrectly concluded that it was a carboxylic acid based on its acidity; the correct bislactone structure was not reported until 1948.

== Properties ==
=== Acidity ===
The compound can easily lose a hydrogen ion from the methylene (CH_{2}) in the ring (carbon 5); which creates a double bond between it and one of the adjacent carbons (number 4 or 6), and a negative charge in the corresponding oxygen. The resulting anion [C_{6}H_{7}O_{4}]^{−} is stabilized by resonance between the two alternatives, so that the double bond is delocalized and each oxygen in the carbonyls has a formal charge of −1/2.

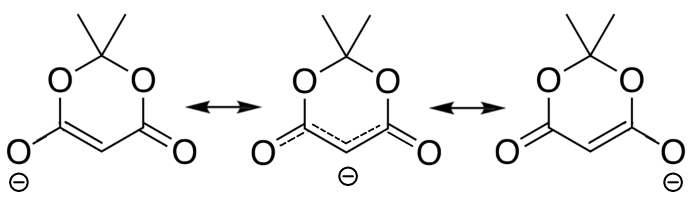

The ionization constant pK_{a} is 4.97; which makes it behave as a monobasic acid even though it contains no carboxylic acid groups. In this and other properties, the compound resembles dimedone and barbituric acid. However, while dimedone exists in solution predominantly as the mono-enol tautomer, Meldrum's acid is almost entirely in the diketone form.

The unusually high acidity of this compound was long considered anomalous—it is 8 orders of magnitude more acidic than the closely related compound dimethyl malonate. In 2004, Ohwada and coworkers determined that the energy-minimizing conformation structure of the compound places the alpha proton's σ*_{CH} orbital in the proper geometry to align with the π^{*}_{CO}, so that the ground state poses unusually strong destabilization of the C-H bond.

== Preparation ==
=== Original synthesis ===
The compound was first made by Meldrum by a condensation reaction of acetone with malonic acid in acetic anhydride and sulfuric acid.

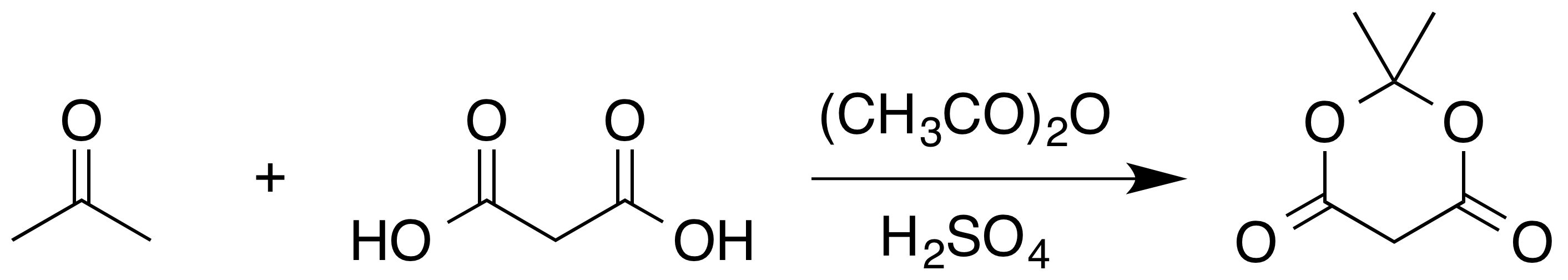

=== Alternative syntheses ===
As an alternative to its original preparation, Meldrum's acid can be synthesized from malonic acid, isopropenyl acetate (an enol derivative of acetone), and catalytic sulfuric acid.

A third route is the reaction of carbon suboxide C_{3}O_{2} with acetone in the presence of oxalic acid.

== Uses ==
Like malonic acid and its ester derivatives, and other 1,3-dicarbonyl compounds, Meldrum's acid can serve as a reactant for a variety of nucleophilic reactions.

=== Alkylation and acylation ===
The acidity of carbon 5 (between the two carbonyl groups) allows simple derivatization of Meldrum's acid at this position, through reactions such as alkylation and acylation. For example, deprotonation and reaction with a simple alkyl halide (R−Cl) attaches the alkyl group (R−) at that position:

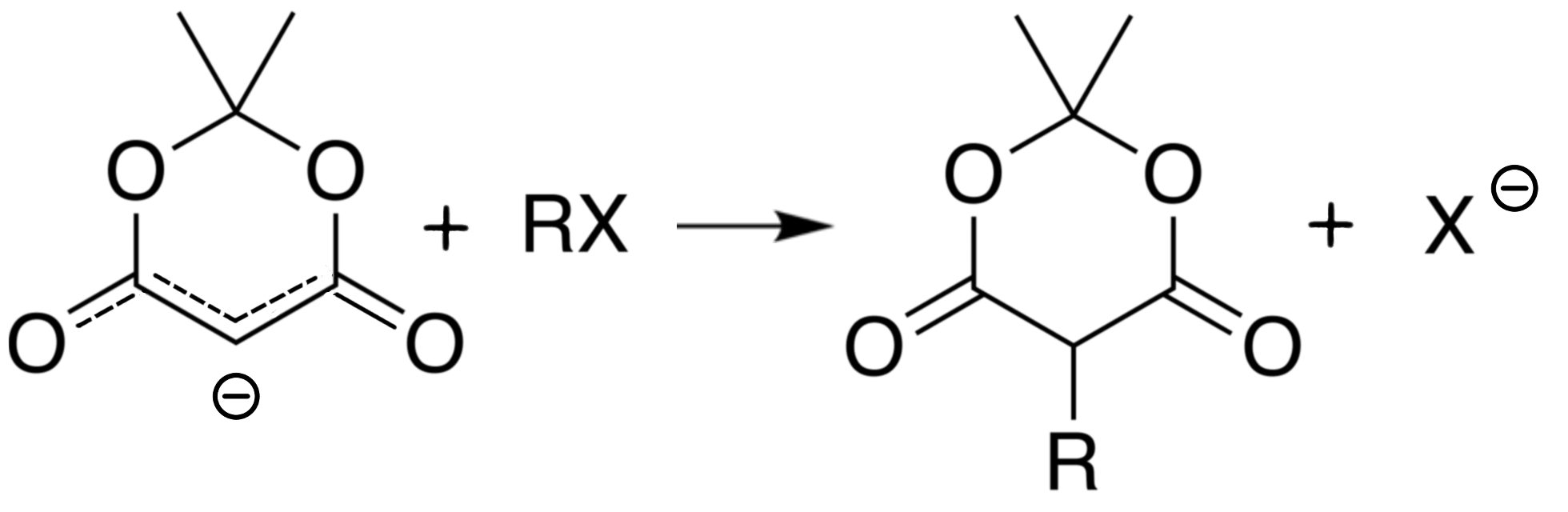

The analogous reaction with an acyl chloride (R−(C=O)−Cl) attaches the acyl (R−(C=O)−) instead:

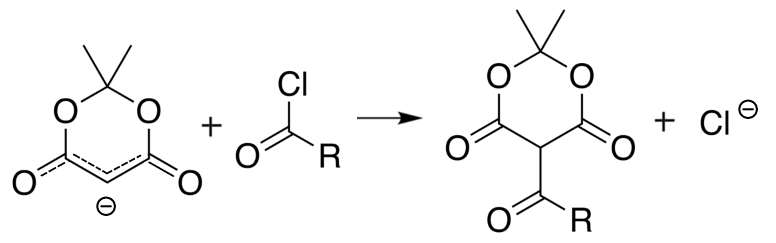

These two reactions allow Meldrum's acid to serve as a starting scaffold for the synthesis of many different structures with various functional groups. The alkylated products can be further manipulated to produce various amide and ester compounds. Heating the acyl product in the presence of an alcohol leads to ester exchange and decarboxylation in a process similar to the malonic ester synthesis. The reactive nature of the cyclic-diester allows good reactivity even for alcohols as hindered as t-butanol, and this reactivity of Meldrum's acid and its derivatives has been used to develop a range of reactions. Ketoesters formed from the reaction of alcohols with Meldrum's acid derivatives are useful in the Knorr pyrrole synthesis.

=== Synthesis of ketenes ===
At temperatures greater than 200 °C (392 °F) Meldrum's acid undergoes a pericyclic reaction that releases acetone and carbon dioxide and produces a highly reactive ketene compound:

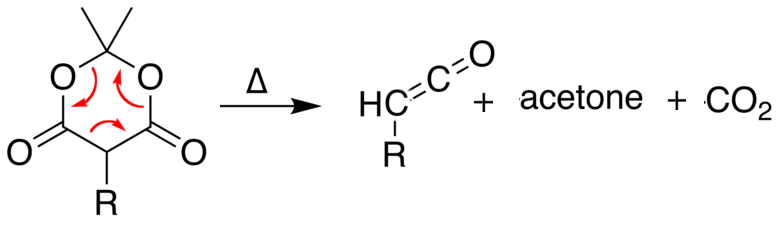

These ketenes can be isolated using flash vacuum pyrolysis (FVP). Ketenes are highly electrophilic and can undergo addition reactions with a range of other chemicals, particularly ketene cycloadditions, or dimerisation to diketene. With this approach it is possible to form new C–C bonds, rings, amides, esters, and acids:

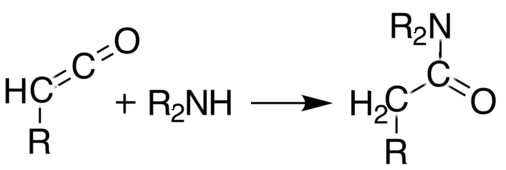

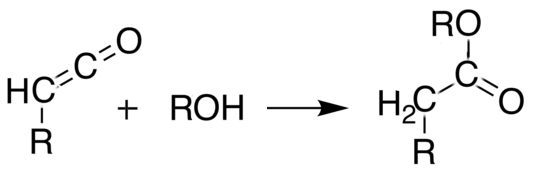

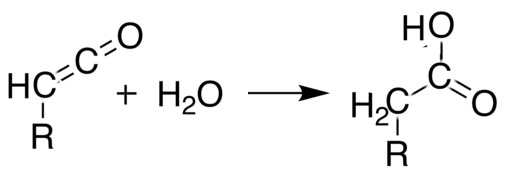

Alternately, the pyrolysis can be performed in solution, to obtain the same results without isolating the ketene, in a one-pot reaction. The ability to form such diverse products makes Meldrum's acid a very useful reagent for synthetic chemists.

== History ==
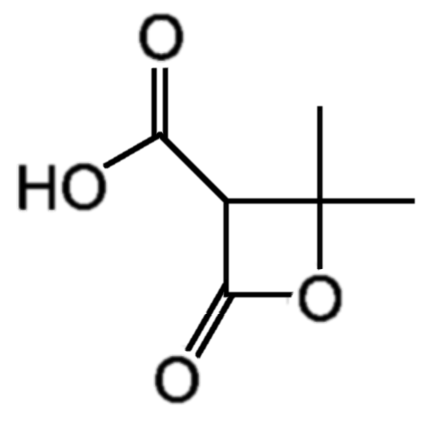
Meldrum's incorrect structure

The compound is named after Andrew Norman Meldrum who reported its synthesis in 1908. He misidentified its structure as a carboxylic acid based on its unusually high acidity, identifying it as the β-lactone of β-hydroxyisopropylmalonic acid; the correct structure, the bislactone of 1,3-dioxane was reported in 1948.
