= Diethyl phenylmalonate =

- Diethyl phenylmalonate

Names
- IUPAC name Diethyl phenylmalonate
- Other names Diethyl phenylpropanedioate; Propanedioic acid 2-phenyl- diethyl ester; Diethyl-phenylmalonat

Identifiers
| CAS Number | 83-13-6 |
| 3D model (JSmol) | Interactive image |
| Beilstein Reference | 614465 |
| ChemSpider | 59885 |
| ECHA InfoCard | 100.001.324 |
| EC Number | 201-456-5 |
| PubChem CID | 66514 |
| UNII | XVQ6PE5CLT |
| CompTox Dashboard (EPA) | DTXSID7058886 |
- InChI: InChI=1S/C13H16O4/c1-3-16-12(14)11(13(15)17-4-2)10-8-6-5-7-9-10/h5-9,11H,3-4H2,1-2H3 Key: FGYDHYCFHBSNPE-UHFFFAOYSA-N
- SMILES: CCOC(=O)C(C1=CC=CC=C1)C(=O)OCC

Properties
| Chemical formula | C_{13}H_{16}O_{4} |
| Molar mass | 236.267 g·mol^{−1} |
| Density | 1.096 g/cm^{3} |
| Melting point | 16.5 °C (61.7 °F; 289.6 K) |
| Boiling point | 170–172 °C (338–342 °F; 443–445 K) (14 mmHg) |
| Refractive index (n_{D}) | n20/D 1.491 |

Hazards
| Flash point | 120 |
| Safety data sheet (SDS) | MSDS |
- Except where otherwise noted, data are given for materials in their standard state (at 25 °C [77 °F], 100 kPa). Infobox references

Diethyl phenylmalonate is an aromatic malonic ester used in the synthesis of moderate to long lasting barbiturates such as phenobarbital.

== Chemical synthesis ==
Unlike other malonic esters that are derived via malonic ester synthesis, diethyl phenylmalonate is typically indirectly derived via a Claisen condensation with diethyl oxalate and ethyl phenylacetate followed by decarbonylation. This indirect method is often used because aryl halides are relatively weaker electrophiles than alkyl halides and thus poorly alkylate diethyl malonate. Methods using Caesium carbonate and copper(I) iodide have been developed to overcome this difficulty however.
