= Diethyl acetamidomalonate =

Identifiers
CAS Number	1068-90-2
3D model (JSmol)	Interactive image
ChEMBL	ChEMBL3278808
ChemSpider	13422
ECHA InfoCard	100.012.685
EC Number	213-952-9
PubChem CID	14041
UNII	4VDX81E00W
CompTox Dashboard (EPA)	DTXSID6061446
- InChI: InChI=1S/C9H15NO5/c1-4-14-8(12)7(10-6(3)11)9(13)15-5-2/h7H,4-5H2,1-3H3,(H,10,11) Key: ISOLMABRZPQKOV-UHFFFAOYSA-N
- SMILES: CCOC(=O)C(C(=O)OCC)NC(=O)C

Properties
Chemical formula	C_{9}H_{15}NO_{5}
Molar mass	217.22 g·mol^{−1}
- Except where otherwise noted, data are given for materials in their standard state (at 25 °C [77 °F], 100 kPa). Infobox references

Diethyl acetamidomalonate (DEAM) is a derivative of malonic acid diethyl ester. Formally, it is derived through the acetylation of ester from the unstable aminomalonic acid. DEAM serves as a starting material for racemates including both, natural and unnatural α-amino acids or hydroxycarboxylic acids. It is also usable as a precursor in pharmaceutical formulations, particularly in the cases of active ingredients like fingolimod, which is used to treat multiple sclerosis.

== Occurrence and preparation ==
A notable method for synthesizing acetamidomalon ester is described in a 1950 patent, which cites a procedure previously featured in Organic Syntheses. The synthesis procedure involves the preparation of malonic acid diethyl ester in acetic acid combined with sodium nitrite (NaNO_{2}), resulting in diethyl isonitrosomalonate (also known as α-oximinomalonic acid diethyl ester).

synthesis of diethyl acetamidomalonate

The process further involves reducing a solution of this intermediate in a mixture of glacial acetic acid and acetic anhydride using zinc powder. The resulting amine is then combined with acetic anhydride to produce the final product DEAM, achieving a total yield of 77% acetylation.

== Properties ==
Diethyl acetamidomalonate is a white powdery substance characterized by low water solubility, but possessing good solvency in lower alcohols and chloroform.

== Applications ==
=== Synthesis of α-amino acids ===
Acetamidomalonic acid diethyl ester can be viewed as a achiral glycine with a protecting group. DEAM comprises a malonic acid diethyl ester structure, making it suitable for malonic ester synthesis. In a three-step process, the synthesis involves deprotonation, alkylation, hydrolysis, and simultaneous decarboxylation, resulting in racemic α-amino acids.

Thus, phenylalanine (rac-Phe) can be produced by alkylating DEAM using benzyl chloride in the presence of sodium ethoxide (NaOEt). Hydrolysis of the carboxylic acid ester and amide functions then follows along with decarboxylation at increased temperatures. This gives the monocarboxylic acid with a 65% yield.

synthesis of rac-phenylalanine

The oxidation-sensitive amino acid rac-tryptophan can be synthesized using diethyl acetamidomalonate and gramine, or through its quaternary ammonium compound which can be obtained with methyl iodide or dimethyl sulfate, yielding results of > 90%.

synthesis of rac-Trp

Alkylation of acetamidomalon diethyl ester can also be carried out using propiolactone, showcasing a high reactivity towards nucleophilicity. This process results in the formation of racemic glutamic acid in a one-pot reaction, yielding 87% .

synthesis of rac-Glu

The method can also be applied to synthesize non-natural α-amino acids, such as those with heterocyclic substituents. The methylene group of diethyl acetamidomalonate can undergo a polarity reversal when DEAM is converted into the dehydroform. This compound can be nucleophilically attacked by organolithium compounds, Grignard compounds, or malonic ester anions.

conversion of diethyl acetamidomalonate

=== Synthesis of α-hydroxycarboxylic acids ===
The amino group in synthetic α-amino acids can be replaced by a hydroxy group through diazotization and overcooking.

Synthesis of 2-hydroxy-4-pentanoic acid from DEAM

An alkyne-carboxylic acid, such as 2-hydroxy-4-pentanoic acid, that can be obtained through this method, can undergo copolymerization with lactic acid. The resulting bonds of alkyne residues that are attached to the polymer chain in the acquired polylactide copolymer can then be made to undergo a cycloaddition with functional organic azides in order to create 1,2,3-triazoles. This process falls under the category of click chemistry, known for mild and smooth reactions.

Click reaction on PLA

=== Syntheses of fingolimod ===
For the production of Fingolimod—an immunosuppressant used to treat multiple sclerosis, numerous synthetic routes have been developed utilizing diethyl acetamidomalonate as the principal component. The key step in these multistep synthesis processes involves typically the alkylation of DEAM with, for example, 4'-(2-iodoethyl)octanophenone.

fingolimod precursor

.
