= Phenobarbital =

Medication of the barbiturate type

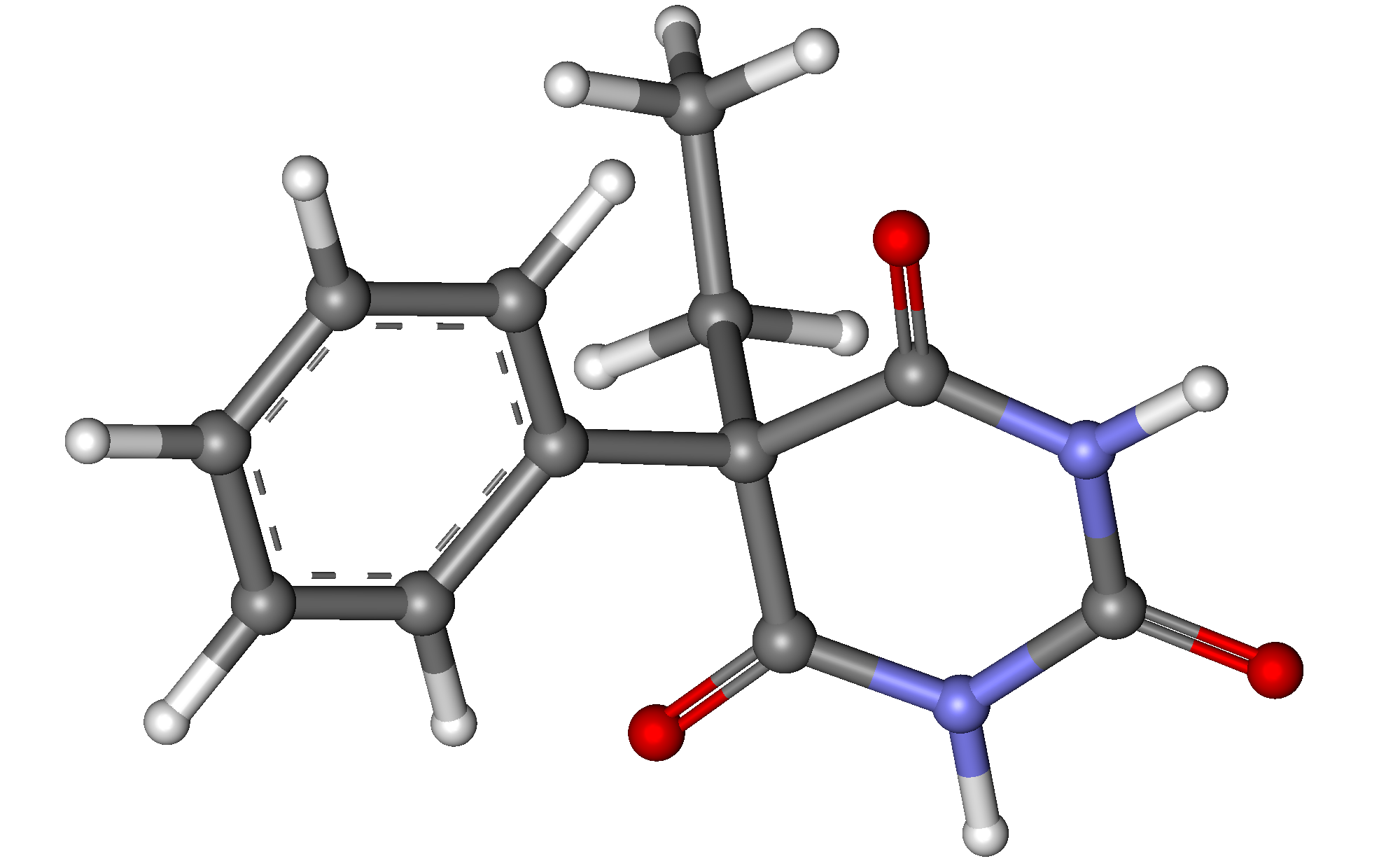

Clinical data
- Trade names: Luminal, Sezaby, others
- Other names: Phenobarbitone
- AHFS/Drugs.com: Monograph
- MedlinePlus: a682007
- License data: US DailyMed: Phenobarbital
- Pregnancy category: AU: D
- Dependence liability: High
- Routes of administration: By mouth, rectal, parenteral, intramuscular, intravenous
- Drug class: Barbiturate, anticonvulsant
- ATC code: N03AA02 (WHO)

Legal status
- Legal status: AU: S4 (Prescription only); BR: Class B1 (Psychoactive drugs); CA: Schedule IV; DE: Prescription only (Anlage III for higher doses); UK: Class B; US: Schedule IV; EU: Rx-only; SE: Förteckning IV In general: ℞ (Prescription only)

Pharmacokinetic data
- Bioavailability: >95%
- Protein binding: 20 to 45%
- Metabolism: Liver (mostly CYP2C19)
- Onset of action: Within 5 min (IV); 30 min (PO)
- Elimination half-life: 53–118 hours
- Duration of action: 4 hours–2 days
- Excretion: Kidney and fecal

Identifiers
- IUPAC name: 5-Ethyl-5-phenyl-1,3-diazinane-2,4,6-trione
- CAS Number: 50-06-6
- PubChem CID: 4763
- IUPHAR/BPS: 2804
- DrugBank: DB01174
- ChemSpider: 4599
- UNII: YQE403BP4D
- KEGG: D00506
- ChEBI: CHEBI:8069
- ChEMBL: ChEMBL40
- CompTox Dashboard (EPA): DTXSID5021122
- ECHA InfoCard: 100.000.007

Chemical and physical data
- Formula: C_{12}H_{12}N_{2}O_{3}
- Molar mass: 232.239 g·mol^{−1}
- 3D model (JSmol): Interactive image
- SMILES: O=C1NC(=O)NC(=O)C1(c2ccccc2)CC
- InChI: InChI=1S/C12H12N2O3/c1-2-12(8-6-4-3-5-7-8)9(15)13-11(17)14-10(12)16/h3-7H,2H2,1H3,(H2,13,14,15,16,17); Key:DDBREPKUVSBGFI-UHFFFAOYSA-N

Phenobarbital, sold under the brand name Luminal among others, is a medication of the barbiturate type. It is recommended by the World Health Organization (WHO) for the treatment of certain types of epilepsy in developing countries. In the developed world, it is commonly used to treat seizures in young children, while other medications are generally used in older children and adults. It is also used for veterinary purposes.

It may be administered by slow intravenous infusion (IV infusion), intramuscularly (IM), or orally (swallowed by mouth). Subcutaneous administration is not recommended. The injectable forms may be used to treat status epilepticus if other drugs fail to achieve satisfactory results. Phenobarbital is occasionally used to treat insomnia, anxiety, and benzodiazepine withdrawal (as well as withdrawal from certain other drugs in specific circumstances), and prior to surgery as an anxiolytic and to induce sedation. It usually begins working within five minutes when used intravenously and half an hour when administered orally. Its effects last for between four hours and two days.

Potentially serious side effects include a decreased level of consciousness and respiratory depression. There is potential for both abuse and withdrawal following long-term use. It may also increase the risk of suicide.

It is pregnancy category D in Australia, meaning that it may cause harm when taken during pregnancy. If used during breastfeeding it may result in drowsiness in the baby. Phenobarbital works by increasing the activity of the inhibitory neurotransmitter GABA.

Phenobarbital was discovered in 1912 and is the oldest still commonly used anti-seizure medication. It is on the World Health Organization's List of Essential Medicines.

== Medical uses ==
=== Seizures ===
Phenobarbital is used in the treatment of all types of seizures, except absence seizures. It is no less effective at seizure control than phenytoin, but phenobarbital is not as well tolerated. Phenobarbital may provide a clinical advantage over carbamazepine for treating partial seizures. Carbamazepine may provide a clinical advantage over phenobarbital for generalized tonic–clonic seizures.

The first-line drugs for treatment of status epilepticus are benzodiazepines, such as lorazepam, clonazepam, midazolam, or diazepam. If these fail, then phenytoin may be used, with phenobarbital being an alternative in the US (favored in infants), but used only third-line in the UK. Failing that, the only treatment is anesthesia in intensive care. The World Health Organization (WHO) gives phenobarbital a first-line recommendation in the developing world and it is commonly used there.

Phenobarbital is the first-line choice for the treatment of neonatal seizures. Concerns that neonatal seizures in themselves could be harmful make most physicians treat them aggressively. However, no reliable evidence supports this approach.

=== Drug withdrawal ===
Phenobarbital is sometimes used for alcohol detoxification and benzodiazepine detoxification for its sedative and anticonvulsant properties. The benzodiazepines chlordiazepoxide (Librium) and oxazepam (Serax) have largely replaced phenobarbital for detoxification.

=== Other uses ===
Phenobarbital is useful for insomnia and anxiety.

Phenobarbital is occasionally prescribed in low doses to aid in the conjugation of bilirubin in people with Crigler–Najjar syndrome, type II, or in people with Gilbert's syndrome. In infants suspected of neonatal biliary atresia, phenobarbital is used in preparation for a ^{99m}Tc-IDA hepatobiliary (HIDA; hepatobiliary ^{99m}Tc-iminodiacetic acid) study that differentiates atresia from hepatitis or cholestasis.

In massive doses, phenobarbital is prescribed to terminally ill people to allow them to end their life through physician-assisted suicide.

== Side effects ==
Sedation and somnolence are the principal side effects (occasionally, they are also the intended effects) of phenobarbital. Central nervous system effects such as dizziness, nystagmus, and ataxia are also common. In elderly patients, it may cause excitement and confusion, while in children, it may result in paradoxical hyperactivity.

Phenobarbital is a cytochrome P450 hepatic enzyme inducer. It binds transcription factor receptors that activate cytochrome P450 transcription, thereby increasing its amount and thus its activity. Caution is to be used with children. Among anticonvulsant drugs, behavioural disturbances occur most frequently with clonazepam and phenobarbital.

== Contraindications ==
Acute intermittent porphyria, hypersensitivity to any barbiturate, prior dependence on barbiturates, severe respiratory insufficiency (as with chronic obstructive pulmonary disease), severe liver failure, pregnancy, and breastfeeding are contraindications for phenobarbital use.

== Overdose ==
Phenobarbital causes a depression of the body's systems, mainly the central and peripheral nervous systems. Thus, the main characteristic of phenobarbital overdose is a "slowing" of bodily functions, including decreased consciousness (even coma), bradycardia, bradypnea, hypothermia, and hypotension (in massive overdoses). Overdose may also lead to pulmonary edema and acute renal failure as a result of shock and can result in death.

The electroencephalogram (EEG) of a person with phenobarbital overdose may show a marked decrease in electrical activity, to the point of mimicking brain death. This is due to profound depression of the central nervous system and is usually reversible.

Treatment of phenobarbital overdose is supportive, and mainly consists of the maintenance of airway patency (through endotracheal intubation and mechanical ventilation), correction of bradycardia and hypotension (with intravenous fluids and vasopressors, if necessary), and removal of as much drug as possible from the body. In very large overdoses, multi-dose activated charcoal is a mainstay of treatment as the drug undergoes enterohepatic recirculation. Urine alkalization (achieved with sodium bicarbonate) enhances renal excretion. Hemodialysis is effective in removing phenobarbital from the body and may reduce its half-life by up to 90%. No specific antidote for barbiturate poisoning is available.

== Mechanism of action ==
Phenobarbital acts as an allosteric modulator which extends the amount of time the chloride ion channel is open by interacting with GABA_{A} receptor subunits. Through this action, phenobarbital increases the flow of chloride ions into the neuron which decreases the excitability of the post-synaptic neuron. Hyperpolarizing this post-synaptic membrane leads to a decrease in the general excitatory aspects of the post-synaptic neuron. By making it harder to depolarize the neuron, the threshold for the action potential of the post-synaptic neuron will be increased.

Direct blockade of glutamatergic AMPA and kainate receptors are also believed to contribute to the hypnotic and anticonvulsant effect that is observed with phenobarbital.

== Pharmacokinetics ==
Phenobarbital has an oral bioavailability of about 90%. Peak plasma concentrations (C_{max}) are reached eight to 12 hours after oral administration. It is one of the longest-acting barbiturates available – it remains in the body for a very long time (half-life of two to seven days) and has very low protein binding (20 to 45%). Phenobarbital is metabolized by the liver, mainly through hydroxylation and glucuronidation and induces many isozymes of the cytochrome P450 system. Cytochrome P450 2B6 (CYP2B6) is specifically induced by phenobarbital via the CAR/RXR nuclear receptor heterodimer. It is excreted primarily by the kidneys.

== History ==
The first barbiturate drug, barbital, was synthesized in 1902 by German chemists Emil Fischer and Joseph von Mering and was first marketed as Veronal by Friedr. Bayer et comp. By 1904, several related drugs, including phenobarbital, had been synthesized by Fischer. Phenobarbital was brought to market in 1912 by the drug company Bayer as the brand Luminal. It remained a commonly prescribed sedative and hypnotic until the introduction of benzodiazepines in the 1960s.

Phenobarbital's soporific, sedative and hypnotic properties were well known in 1912, but it was not yet known to be an effective anticonvulsant. The young doctor Alfred Hauptmann gave it to his epilepsy patients as a tranquilizer and discovered their seizures were susceptible to the drug. Hauptmann performed a careful study of his patients over an extended period. Most of these patients were using the only effective drug then available, bromide, which had terrible side effects and limited efficacy. On phenobarbital, their epilepsy was much improved: those with the most severe disease had fewer and lighter seizures while some patients became seizure-free. In addition, they improved physically and mentally as bromides were removed from their regimen. Patients who had been institutionalised due to the severity of their epilepsy were able to leave and, in some cases, resume employment. Hauptmann dismissed concerns that its effectiveness in stalling seizures could lead to patients developing a build-up that needed to be "discharged". As he expected, withdrawal of the drug led to an increase in seizure frequency – it was not a cure. The drug was quickly adopted as the first widely effective anticonvulsant, though World War I delayed its introduction in the U.S.

In 1939, a German family asked Adolf Hitler to have their disabled son killed; the five-month-old boy was given a lethal dose of Luminal after Hitler sent his own doctor to examine him. A few days later 15 psychiatrists were summoned to Hitler's Chancellery and directed to commence a clandestine program of involuntary euthanasia.

In 1940, at a clinic in Ansbach, Germany, around 50 intellectually disabled children were injected with Luminal and killed that way. A plaque was erected in their memory in 1988 in the local hospital at Feuchtwanger Strasse 38, although a newer plaque does not mention that patients were killed using barbiturates on site. Luminal was used in the Nazi children's euthanasia program until at least 1943.

Phenobarbital was used to treat neonatal jaundice by increasing liver metabolism and thus lowering bilirubin levels. In the 1950s, phototherapy was discovered, and became the standard treatment.

Phenobarbital was used for over 25 years as prophylaxis in the treatment of febrile seizures. Although an effective treatment in preventing recurrent febrile seizures, it had no positive effect on patient outcome or risk of developing epilepsy. The treatment of simple febrile seizures with anticonvulsant prophylaxis is no longer recommended.

== Names ==
Phenobarbital is the INN and phenobarbitone is the former BAN.

== Synthesis ==
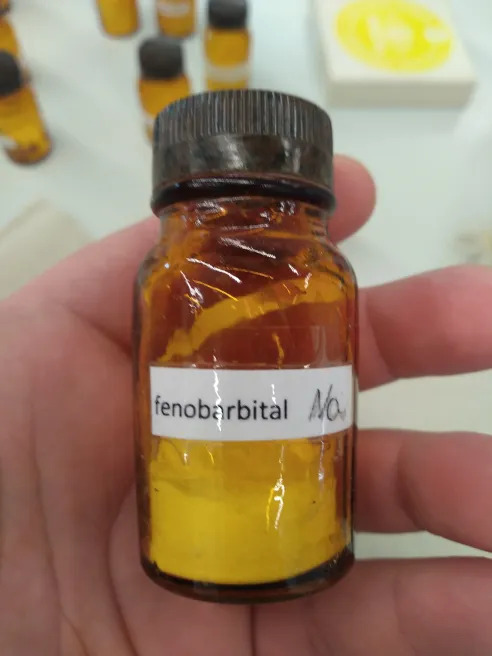
Phenobarbital sodium salt

Barbiturate drugs are obtained via condensation reactions between a derivative of diethyl malonate and urea in the presence of a strong base. The synthesis of phenobarbital uses this common approach as well but differs in the way in which this malonate derivative is obtained. The reason for this difference is because aryl halides do not typically undergo nucleophilic substitution in Malonic ester synthesis in the same way as aliphatic organosulfates or halocarbons do. To overcome this lack of chemical reactivity two dominant synthetic approaches using benzyl cyanide as a starting material have been developed:

The first of these methods consists of a Pinner reaction of benzyl cyanide, giving phenylacetic acid ethyl ester. Subsequently, this ester undergoes cross Claisen condensation using diethyl oxalate, giving diethyl ester of phenyloxobutandioic acid. Upon heating this intermediate easily loses carbon monoxide, yielding diethyl phenylmalonate. Malonic ester synthesis using ethyl bromide leads to the formation of α-phenyl-α-ethylmalonic ester. Finally, a condensation reaction with urea gives phenobarbital.

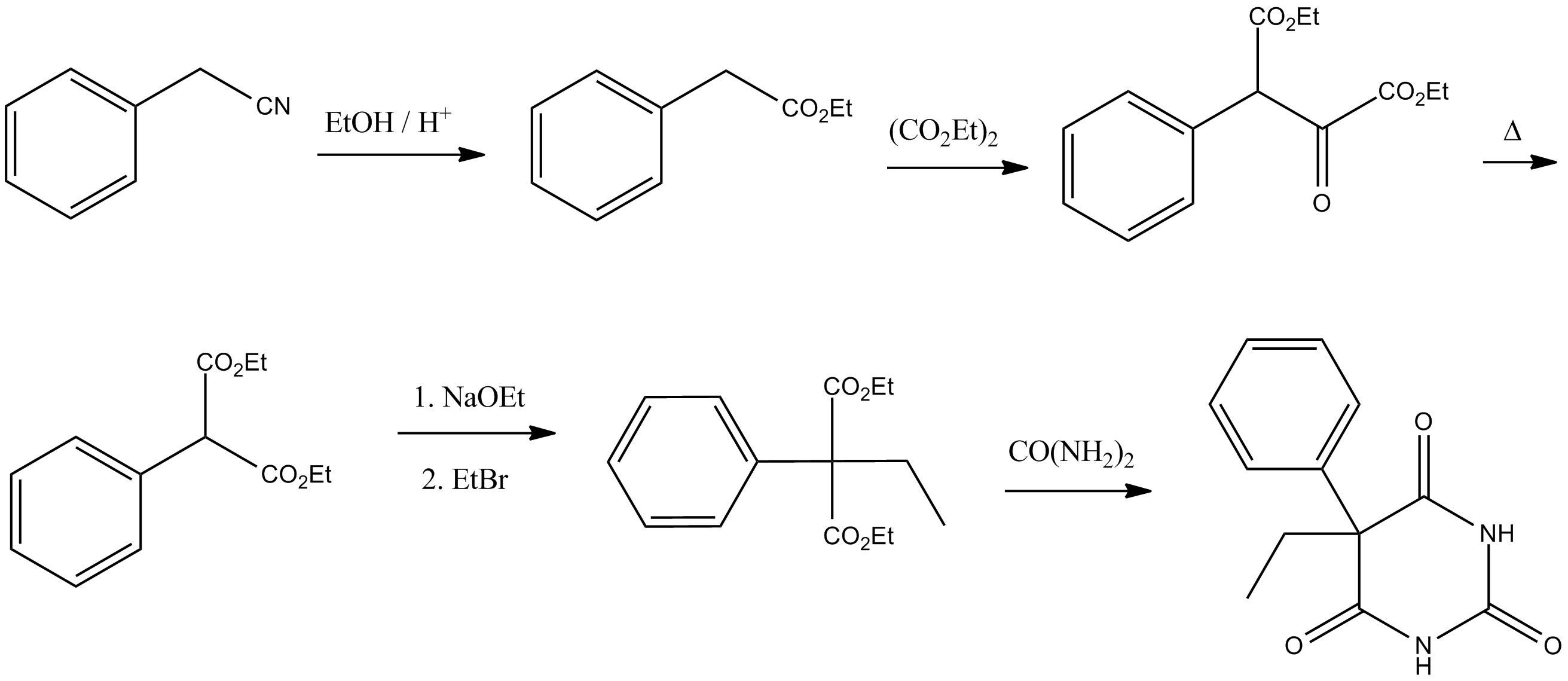

The second approach utilizes diethyl carbonate in the presence of a strong base to give α-phenylcyanoacetic ester. Alkylation of this ester using ethyl bromide proceeds via a nitrile anion intermediate to give the α-phenyl-α-ethylcyanoacetic ester. This product is then further converted into the 4-iminoderivative upon condensation with urea. Finally acidic hydrolysis of the resulting product gives phenobarbital.

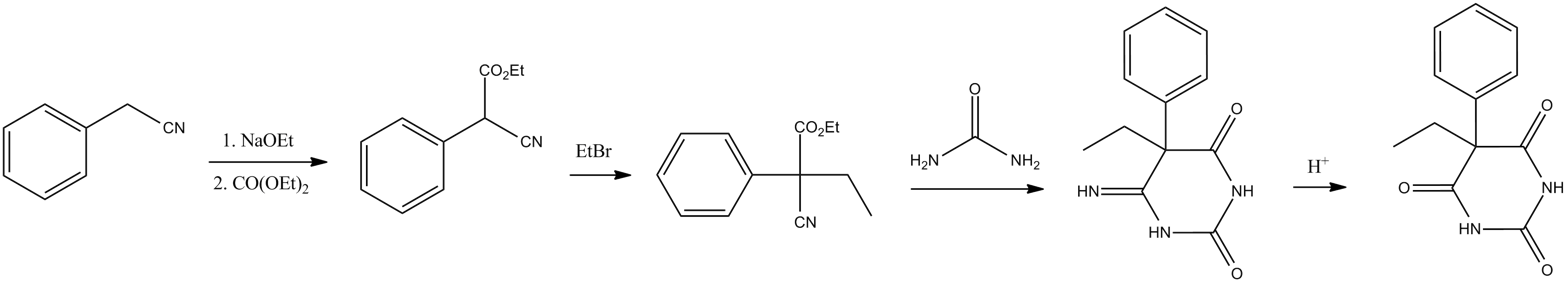

A new synthetic route based on diethyl 2-ethyl-2-phenylmalonate and urea has been described.

== Society and culture ==
=== Regulation ===
The level of regulation includes Schedule IV non-narcotic (depressant) (ACSCN 2285) in the United States under the Controlled Substances Act 1970—but along with a few other barbiturates and at least one benzodiazepine, and codeine, dionine, or dihydrocodeine at low concentrations, it also has exempt prescription and had at least one exempt OTC combination drug now more tightly regulated for its ephedrine content. The phenobarbitone/phenobarbital exists in subtherapeutic doses which add up to an effective dose to counter the overstimulation and possible seizures from a deliberate overdose in ephedrine tablets for asthma, which are now regulated at the federal and state level as: a restricted OTC medicine and/or watched precursor, uncontrolled but watched/restricted prescription drug & watched precursor, a Schedule II, III, IV, or V prescription-only controlled substance & watched precursor, or a Schedule V (which also has possible regulations at the county/parish, town, city, or district as well aside from the fact that the pharmacist can also choose not to sell it, and photo ID and signing a register is required) exempt Non-Narcotic restricted/watched OTC medicine.

=== Non-medical uses ===
Like other barbiturates, phenobarbital can be used recreationally, but this is reported to be relatively infrequent.

=== Selected overdoses ===
A mysterious woman, known as the Isdal Woman, was found dead in Bergen, Norway, on 29 November 1970. Her death was caused by some combination of burns, phenobarbital, and carbon monoxide poisoning; many theories about her death have been posited, and it is believed that she may have been a spy.

British veterinarian Donald Sinclair, the inspiration for the character Siegfried Farnon in the All Creatures Great and Small book series by James Herriot, committed suicide at the age of 84 by injecting himself with an overdose of phenobarbital. Activist Abbie Hoffman also committed suicide by consuming phenobarbital, combined with alcohol, on 12 April 1989; the residue of around 150 pills was found in his body at autopsy.

Thirty-nine members of the Heaven's Gate UFO cult committed mass suicide in March 1997 by drinking a lethal dose of phenobarbital and vodka "and then lay down to die" hoping to enter an alien spacecraft.

== Research ==
The synthesis of a photoswitchable analog (DASA-barbital) and phenobarbital has been described for use as a research compound in photopharmacology.

== Veterinary uses ==
Phenobarbital is one of the first-line drugs of choice to treat epilepsy in dogs, as well as cats.

It is also used to treat feline hyperesthesia syndrome in cats when anti-obsessional therapies prove ineffective.

It may also be used to treat seizures in horses when benzodiazepine treatment has failed or is contraindicated.
