= Hyperesthesia =

Abnormal increase in sensitivity to sensory stimuli

- Other names: Hyperaesthesia
- Specialty: Neurology, psychiatry

Hyperesthesia is a condition that involves an abnormal increase in sensitivity to stimuli of the senses. Stimuli of the senses can include sound that one hears, foods that one tastes, textures that one feels, and so on and so forth. Increased touch sensitivity is referred to as "tactile hyperesthesia", and increased sound sensitivity is called "auditory hyperesthesia". In the context of pain, hyperaesthesia can refer to an increase in sensitivity where there is both allodynia and hyperalgesia.

In psychology, Jeanne Siaud-Facchin uses the term by defining it as an "exacerbation des sens" that characterizes gifted individuals: for them, the sensory information reaches the brain much faster than the average, and the information is processed in a significantly shorter time.

== Other animals ==
Feline hyperesthesia syndrome is an uncommon but recognized condition in cats, particularly Siamese, Burmese, Himalayan, and Abyssinian cats. It can affect cats of all ages, though it is most prevalent during maturity. Detection can be somewhat difficult as it is characterized by brief bursts of abnormal behavior, lasting around a minute or two. One of its symptoms is also found in dogs that have canine distemper disease (CD) caused by canine distemper virus (CDV).

== See also ==
- Auditory processing disorder
- Hyperacusis
- Misophonia
- Multisensory integration
- Sensory overload
- Sensory processing
- Sensory processing disorder
- Sensory processing sensitivity
