= Diammonium malonate =

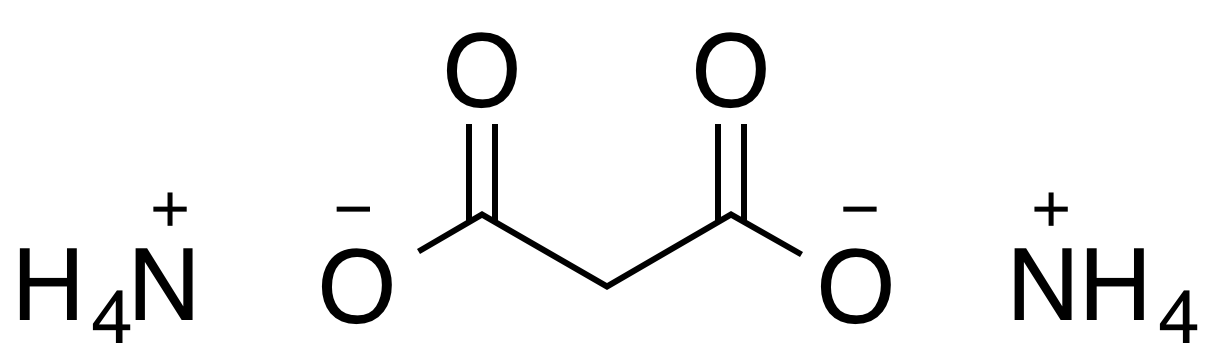

Names
- IUPAC name diazanium;propanedioate
- Other names ammonium malonate

Identifiers
| CAS Number | 56221-41-1 |
| 3D model (JSmol) | Interactive image |
| ChemSpider | 8466296 |
| EC Number | 239-485-0 |
| PubChem CID | 10290827 |
- InChI: InChI=1S/C3H4O4.2H3N/c4-2(5)1-3(6)7;;/h1H2,(H,4,5)(H,6,7);2*1H3 Key: FRRMMWJCHSFNSG-UHFFFAOYSA-N
- SMILES: C(C(=O)[O-])C(=O)[O-].[NH4+].[NH4+]

Properties
| Chemical formula | C_{3}H_{10}N_{2}O_{4} |
| Molar mass | 138.123 g·mol^{−1} |
| Boiling point | 419.6 °C |

Hazards
- GHS labelling
| Pictograms | (GHS07: Exclamation mark) |
| Flash point | 207.6 °C |
- Except where otherwise noted, data are given for materials in their standard state (at 25 °C [77 °F], 100 kPa). Infobox references

Diammonium malonate is a chemical compound with the chemical formula C_{3}H_{10}N_{2}O_{4}.This is an organic ammonium salt of malonic acid.

== Synthesis ==
The compound can be prepared by reacting malonic acid and ammonium hydroxide.
