= Phob =

Phob may refer to:

- Phobia
- Phenobarbital, by the trade name Phob
