= Disodium malonate =

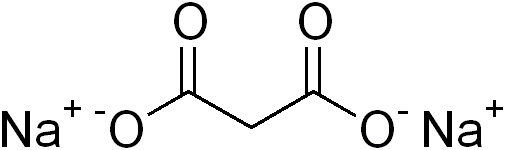

Names
- Preferred IUPAC name Disodium propanedioate
- Other names Sodium malonate

Identifiers
| CAS Number | 141-95-7 |
| 3D model (JSmol) | Interactive image |
| ChEMBL | ChEMBL359504 |
| ChemSpider | 8532 |
| ECHA InfoCard | 100.005.013 |
| EC Number | 205-14-0 |
| PubChem CID | 8865 |
| UNII | 9QWE64M39H |
| CompTox Dashboard (EPA) | DTXSID8059712 |
- InChI: InChI=1S/C3H4O4.2Na/c4-2(5)1-3(6)7;;/h1H2,(H,4,5)(H,6,7);;/q;2*+1/p-2 Key: PRWXGRGLHYDWPS-UHFFFAOYSA-L
- SMILES: [Na+].[Na+].[O-]C(=O)CC([O-])=O

Properties
| Chemical formula | C_{3}H_{2}O_{4}Na_{2} |
| Molar mass | 148.025 g/mol |
| Boiling point | 659.93K |
- Except where otherwise noted, data are given for materials in their standard state (at 25 °C [77 °F], 100 kPa). verify (what is ?) Infobox references

Disodium malonate is a sodium salt of malonic acid with the chemical formula CH_{2}(COONa)_{2}. It is a white crystal soluble in water but not in alcohols, esters or benzene.

It can be prepared from the reaction of sodium hydroxide and malonic acid:

CH_{2}(COOH)_{2} + 2 NaOH → CH_{2}(COONa)_{2} + 2 H_{2}O

Disodium malonate can be used to lower succinate levels in the brain after myocardial infarction.
