= Feline hyperesthesia syndrome =

Collection of neurological symptoms in domestic cats

- Other names: "Feline hyperaesthesia syndrome", "apparent neuritis", "atypical neurodermatitis", "psychomotor epilepsy", "pruritic dermatitis of Siamese", "rolling skin syndrome", "twitchy skin disease", and "twitchy cat disease".
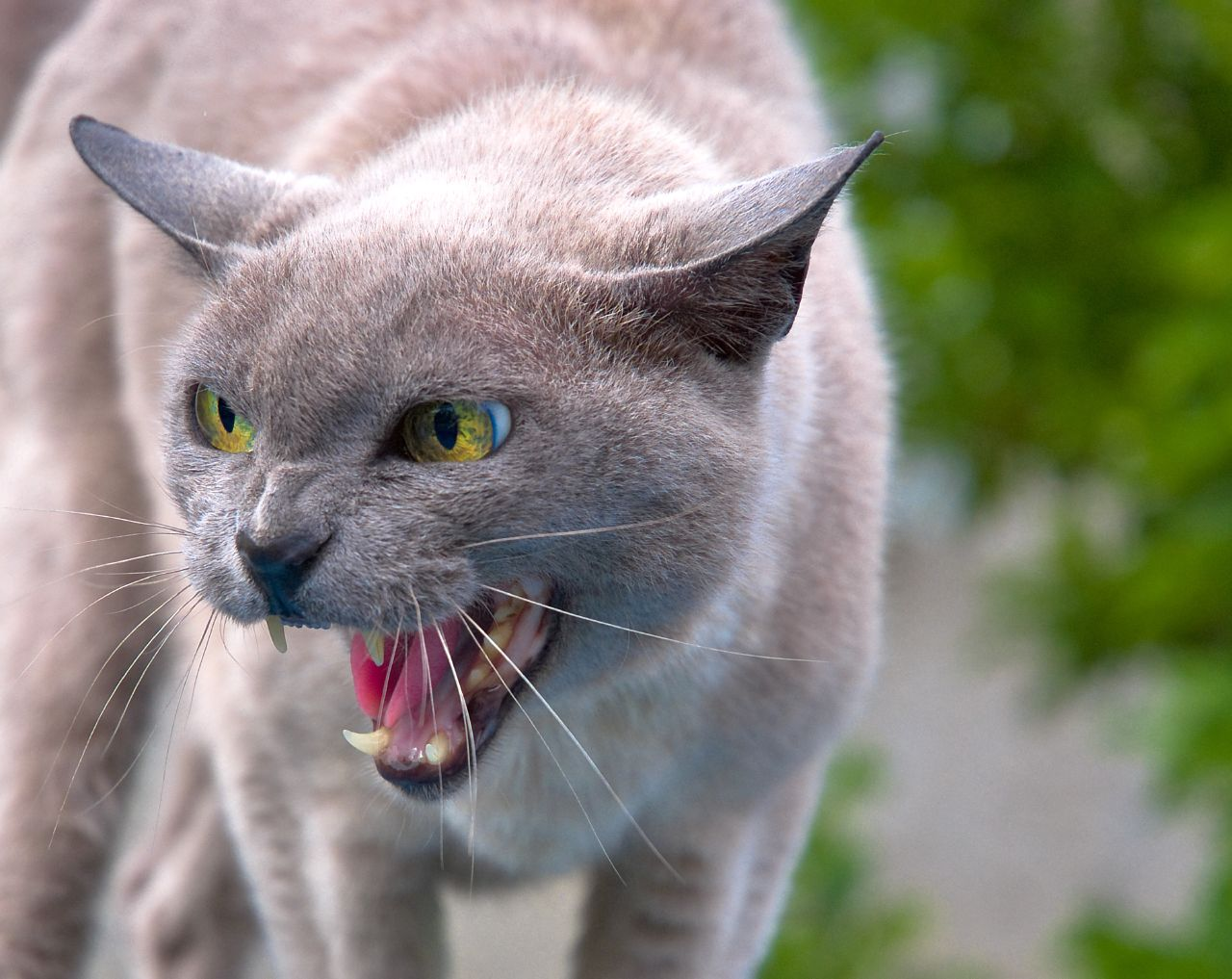
- Domestic cat showing signs of aggression
- Symptoms: Frantic scratching, biting or grooming of tail and lower back; aggression towards other animals, humans and itself; and a rippling or rolling of the dorsal lumbar skin.
- Usual onset: Around 9–12 months, or when the cat reaches maturity.
- Duration: The syndrome will remain present for the cat's entire life, but episodes only last for one to two minutes.
- Treatment: Behavioural adaptation, pharmaceuticals and alternative medicine.
- Prognosis: Good, provided the cat doesn't self-mutilate excessively.

First reported in 1980 by J. Tuttle in a scientific article, feline hyperesthesia syndrome, also known as rolling skin disease, is a complex and poorly understood syndrome that can affect domestic cats of any age, breed, and sex. The syndrome may also be referred to as feline hyperaesthesia syndrome, apparent neuritis, atypical neurodermatitis, psychomotor epilepsy, pruritic dermatitis of Siamese, rolling skin syndrome, and twitchy cat disease. The syndrome usually appears in cats after they've reached maturity, with most cases first arising in cats between one and five years old.

The condition is most commonly identified by frantic scratching, biting or grooming of the lumbar area, generally at the base of the tail, and a rippling or rolling of the dorsal lumbar skin. These clinical signs usually appear in a distinct episode, with cats returning to normal afterwards. During these episodes, affected cats can be extremely difficult to distract from their behaviour, and often appear to be absent-minded or in a trance-like state. Overall, the prognosis for the syndrome is good, so long as the syndrome does not result in excessive self-aggression and self-mutilation that may lead to infection.

== Clinical signs ==
Feline hyperesthesia syndrome affects the endocrine system, nervous system, neuromuscular system, and exocrine system. Cats affected by the condition may display a variable number of clinical signs based on the underlying cause. Clinical signs include aggression towards people; aggression towards animals; self-aggression; dilated pupils; salivation; vocalisation; uncontrolled urination; excessive grooming, particularly of the lumbar region; tail chasing; tail mutilation, caused by scratching and biting of the lumbar region and tail; frantic running and jumping; and a rippling or rolling of the skin in the dorsal lumbar area. Additionally, hallucinations and behaviour similar to oestrus, commonly referred to as heat, have been observed and were reported in the first article on the syndrome in 1980.

Clinical signs will generally present themselves in brief episodes of one to two minutes. After such episode, the cat will generally return to its normal behaviour. These episodes can occur multiple times per day or per week, and may be triggered by endogenous or exogenous stimuli.

The rolling of the dorsal, lumbar region of skin is instigated by the skeletal muscle (cutaneous trunci). This muscle is located directly under the skin and is hyperresponsive when scratched, which thereby causes the rippling effect. It has been noted, however, that the rolling of the skin, among other clinical signs, can occur spontaneously, whether this is a direct result of the syndrome or a result of muscle memory being activated by sensations caused by the syndrome has yet to be determined.

== Cause ==
The causes of feline hyperesthesia syndrome are highly disputed, largely due to the unknown pathophysiology of the syndrome and the variation in responses to different treatment methods. There are three main theories on the cause of the syndrome, as outlined below:

The first theory suggests feline hyperesthesia syndrome is a behavioural disorder, which is caused by either behavioural displacement or stress factors. Stress increases the release of [alpha]-melanocyte-stimulating hormone and causes increased grooming and endorphin production. Behavioural displacement would occur when a cat experiences an overwhelming impulse to complete two or more unrelated behaviours simultaneously; this may lead to the cat completing a third and often unrelated activity, such as grooming. If this displacement behaviour continues for a prolonged period, it may result in the cat developing a compulsive behaviour disorder that would no longer be reliant on the original competing behavioural motivations. Excessive grooming and self-mutilation are recognised signs of obsessive compulsive disorder, lending credence to the overall idea that the syndrome is a behavioural disorder, but also supporting the third main theory that is mentioned later. It has been noted that affected cats tend to be dominating rather than submissive; some research argues that feline hyperesthesia syndrome is a form of conflict displacement, rather than just a form of general behavioural displacement, wherein the affected cat acts out thwarted territorial disputes on its own body. The overall theory that feline hyperesthesia syndrome is a behavioural disorder is disputed on the basis of the variability of responses within affected cats to behaviour modification and psychoactive drugs, as a purely behavioural syndrome would be expected to enter remission after the application of the aforementioned therapeutic treatments.

The second theory proposes that the syndrome is a seizure disorder, and that episodes of vocalisation, wild running, jumping, uncontrolled urination, and tail-chasing are instances of epileptic activity. This theory is supported by reports of cats showing signs of epileptic seizures after an attack, with dilated pupils and dazed and absent behaviour. Use of antiepileptic drugs achieves a partial response in some affected cats; however, affected cats generally rely on a mixture of therapeutic treatments to combat all clinical signs. This theory is disputed on account of there being variable responses within affected cats to the antiepileptic drugs used for treatment and a lack of known neurological cause with no evidence having been found to demonstrate intracranial or extracranial causes of epilepsy.

The final theory of the three main theories is that the syndrome is not a distinct entity, but a conglomerate of unique behaviours caused by a variety of environmental and behavioural factors. This theory is supported by the variability of clinical signs within affected cats, with many of the clinical signs being present within other feline disorders including dermatological, behavioural, orthopaedic and neurological disorders. Further support of this theory is provided by the mixed response to a wide range of therapeutic treatment. Overall, however, a consensus on the validity of this theory has not yet been reached.

Currently, it is unknown whether there is any genetic link to the disease. Although any age, breed, or sex of cat can develop feline hyperesthesia syndrome, it has been noted that Abyssinian, Burmese, Himalayan and Siamese breeds appear to have an increased risk of developing the disease, therefore there is the possibility of a genetic link.

It has also been observed that injury could be a predisposing factor of feline hyperesthesia syndrome. However, because injuries affect cats in numerous ways, increasing their stress and anxiety as well as affecting their physical well-being, this knowledge does not settle the debate on whether the condition is behavioural, epileptic or an umbrella term for several underlying conditions.

In regards to the early theories, some consider tail mutilation to be associated with neuropathic pain rather than a direct clinical sign of feline hyperesthesia syndrome. This would be the case if feline hyperesthesia syndrome causes allodynia, a painful reaction to stimuli that should otherwise not cause pain, or alloknesis, where stimuli cause a pruriceptive sensation, commonly known as an itch, where the stimuli otherwise would not. It is notable when considering this theory, that some cats have been known to obsessively lick the base of their tail, rather than scratching or biting, which may suggest they're not feeling pain or pruritus, but rather an overwhelming compulsive motivation. It has, however, been hypothesised that due to itch and pain receptors sharing peripheral and central nervous system pathways, underlying pain may result in the excessive grooming described. Regardless of whether an affected cat demonstrates grooming or self-mutilating behaviours, they all tend to run around frantically following the completion of the activity.

== Diagnosis ==
Diagnosing cats with feline hyperesthesia syndrome is extremely complicated. The lack of pathophysiological knowledge requires the syndrome to be diagnosed by eliminating other possible causes of clinical signs. This is a time-consuming and often expensive process that most pet-owners opt-out of, choosing instead to treat the behaviours and symptoms with a variety of therapeutic trials without a definitive diagnosis.

Many of the behaviours associated with feline hyperesthesia syndrome resemble or are identical to behaviours observed in other feline health disorders; for instance, there is significant overlap between psychogenic alopecia and feline hyperesthesia syndrome. Because feline hyperesthesia syndrome affects the endocrine, nervous, neuromuscular and exocrine systems, other disorders that affect these organ systems need to be ruled out. This includes skin disorders that cause pruritus such as allergies, fungal infections, parasites and dermatitis; spinal problems such as arthritis, pinched nerves and slipped discs; and forebrain issues that may lead to phantom pains. Tests that can be used to eliminate these possibilities include a general physical, neurological exam, blood chemistry analysis, urine analysis, radiography, magnetic resonance imaging, muscle biopsy, bile acid tolerance, cerebral spinal fluid analysis, and serologic testing for infectious causes.

Behavioural history can be a useful diagnostic tool for this syndrome. Information on a cat's tendency towards obsessive compulsive disorders, anxiety, fear, and over-attachment to its owner is highly advantageous for diagnosis and treatment. Wherever possible, cases of feline hyperesthesia syndrome should be referred to a specialist in feline behaviour for a secondary opinion.

Although the syndrome is highly misunderstood and there is still much that needs to be learned, it is possible to use current knowledge to guide diagnosis. For instance, while the syndrome may affect domestic cats of any breed, age, or sex, it is possible to use trends to determine the likelihood that a cat with similar clinical signs as those caused by feline hyperesthesia syndrome is indeed experiencing the aforementioned condition. It is much less likely that a cat that is under a year old and has not reached maturity has the syndrome rather than an alternate ailment that may be causing similar clinical signs. Likewise, if a cat belongs to either the Abyssinian, Burmese, Himalayan or Siamese breeds, then feline hyperesthesia syndrome should be considered a lot more carefully as a cause of any possible clinical signs.

== Treatment ==
The complexity of feline hyperesthesia syndrome is mirrored in its treatment. Treatment options often involve a significant trial-and-error phase to figure out what will work for the individual affected cat. This relates back to the dispute on the cause of the syndrome, as depending on the veterinarian's personal scientific beliefs and the clinical signs present, the veterinarian may recommend different treatment methods.

Generally, the first step to treating the syndrome is to eliminate or reduce environmental factors that may cause outbreaks, stress, or anxiety. This is usually done by identifying behaviour that precipitates attacks and limiting factors that lead to this behaviour. Most cases require owners to either stop or limit touching the cat's lower-back, maintain scheduled feeding times, and organise specific play times.

If behavioural modification does not lessen signs of the syndrome, then pharmacological solutions may become necessary. The type of drug used will depend on the suspected underlying cause. Listed below are several types of drugs that may be used to treat the condition or its symptoms, common drugs used in the treatment of this condition have been included as examples of each type of drug:

Anti-inflammatory drugs, such as prednisolone, will be used if it is suspected the cause is related to dermatitis or other skin conditions.

Antiepileptic drugs will be used if the cause is suspected to be seizure related. Phenobarbital is the most effective of these drugs but does not work on every cat. Gabapentin may be used for both its analgesic and antiepileptic properties. It must, however, be xylitol free, as xylitol is toxic substance for several animals.

Behaviour modifying drugs are used when a behavioural disorder is the suspected cause. These may include selective serotonin reuptake inhibitors, tricyclic antidepressants, or benzodiazepines.

Carnitine and coenzymes are used when it is suspected that myopathy is the cause of the attacks.

Other treatments have also been attempted such as acupuncture or the use of Elizabethan collars and tail bandaging. Acupuncture has been successfully used as treatment within at least one suspected case of feline hyperesthesia syndrome. In extreme cases, the Elizabethan collar and tail bandaging become necessary to stop self-mutilation. Where a successful treatment is found, the treatment must generally be continued for the life of the cat, with clinical signs often reappearing when treatments are discontinued.
