= Dimethyl malonate =

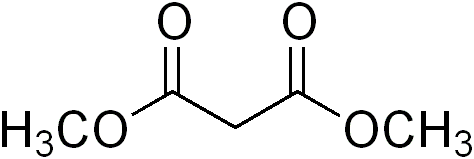

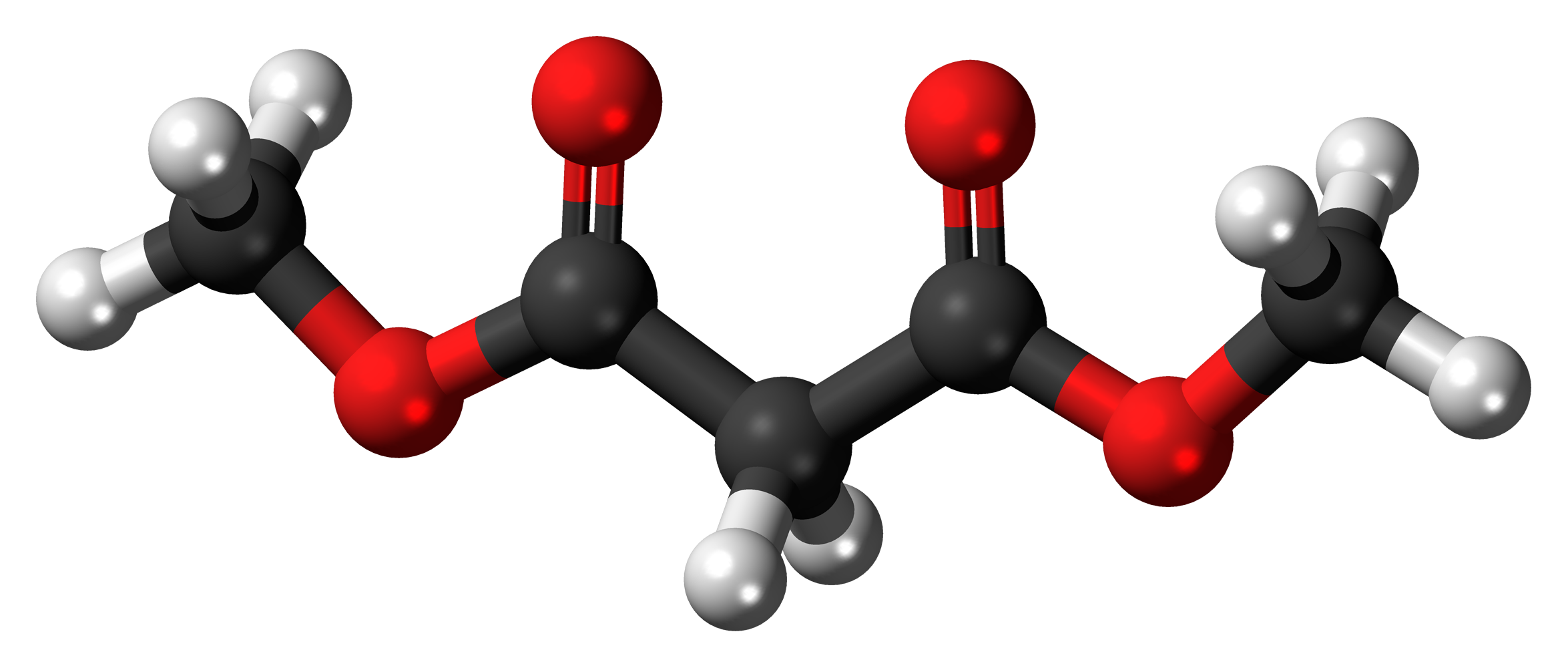

Names
- Preferred IUPAC name Dimethyl propanedioate
- Other names Malonic acid dimethyl ester

Identifiers
CAS Number	108-59-8
3D model (JSmol)	Interactive image
ChemSpider	21106102
ECHA InfoCard	100.003.271
PubChem CID	7943
UNII	EM8Y79998C
CompTox Dashboard (EPA)	DTXSID4029145
- InChI: InChI=1S/C5H8O4/c1-8-4(6)3-5(7)9-2/h3H2,1-2H3 Key: BEPAFCGSDWSTEL-UHFFFAOYSA-N; InChI=1/C5H8O4/c1-8-4(6)3-5(7)9-2/h3H2,1-2H3 Key: BEPAFCGSDWSTEL-UHFFFAOYAJ
- SMILES: COC(=O)CC(=O)OC

Properties
Chemical formula	C_{5}H_{8}O_{4}
Molar mass	132.115 g·mol^{−1}
Appearance	Colorless liquid
Density	1.154
Melting point	−62 °C (−80 °F; 211 K)
Boiling point	180 to 181 °C (356 to 358 °F; 453 to 454 K)
Solubility in water	Slightly soluble
Magnetic susceptibility (χ)	−69.69·10^{−6} cm^{3}/mol
- Except where otherwise noted, data are given for materials in their standard state (at 25 °C [77 °F], 100 kPa). verify (what is ?) Infobox references

Dimethyl malonate is a diester derivative of malonic acid. It is a common reagent for organic synthesis used, for example, as a precursor for barbituric acid. It is also used in the malonic ester synthesis. It can be synthesized from dimethoxymethane and carbon monoxide.

$$\mathrm{H_2C(OCH_3)_2 + 2 \ CO \longrightarrow CH_2(CO_2CH_3)_2}$$

Dimethyl malonate is used extensively in the fragrance industry as a raw material in the synthesis of jasmonates. For example, methyl dihydrojasmonate is synthesized from cyclopentanone, pentanal and dimethyl malonate. Hedione is used in almost all fine fragrances and is found in Christian Dior's Eau Sauvage and "Diorella", Hermes' "Voyage d'Hermes Parfum", Calvin Klein's "CKOne", Chanel's "Chanel No. 19", and Mark Jacob's "Blush", among others. As of 2009, Hedione was Firmenich's top selling compound by volume.

Hebei Chengxin is the world's largest producer of dimethyl malonate by volume and uses a chloroacetic acid/sodium cyanide process developed in the 1940s.

== See also ==
- Diethyl malonate
