= Barbiturate dependence =

- Specialty: Psychiatry, narcology, addiction medicine

Barbiturate dependence develops with regular use of barbiturates. This in turn may lead to a need for increasing doses of the drug to get the original desired pharmacological or therapeutic effect. Barbiturate use can lead to both addiction and physical dependence, and as such they have a high potential for excess or non-medical use, however, it does not affect all users. Management of barbiturate dependence involves considering the affected person's age, comorbidity and the pharmacological pathways of barbiturates.

Psychological addiction to barbiturates can develop quickly. The patients will then have a strong desire to take any barbiturate-like drug. The chronic use of barbiturates leads to moderate degradation of the personality with narrowing of interests, passivity and loss of volition. The somatic signs include hypomimia, problems articulating, weakening of reflexes, and ataxia.

The GABA_{A} receptor, one of barbiturates' main sites of action, is thought to play a pivotal role in the development of tolerance to and dependence on barbiturates, as well as the euphoric "high" that results from their use. The mechanism by which barbiturate tolerance develops is believed to be different from that of ethanol or benzodiazepines, even though these drugs have been shown to exhibit cross-tolerance with each other and poly drug administration of barbiturates and alcohol used to be common.

The management of a physical dependence on barbiturates is stabilisation on the long-acting barbiturate phenobarbital followed by a gradual titration down of dose. People who use barbiturates tend to prefer rapid-acting barbiturates (amobarbital, pentobarbital, secobarbital) rather than long-acting barbiturates (barbital, phenobarbital). The slowly eliminated phenobarbital lessens the severity of the withdrawal syndrome and reduces the chances of serious barbiturate withdrawal effects such as seizures. A cold turkey withdrawal can in some cases lead to death. Antipsychotics are not recommended for barbiturate withdrawal (or other CNS depressant withdrawal states) especially clozapine, olanzapine or low potency phenothiazines e.g. chlorpromazine as they lower the seizure threshold and can worsen withdrawal effects; if used extreme caution is required. The withdrawal symptoms after ending barbiturate consumption are quite severe and last from 4 to 7 days.
