= Andrew Norman Meldrum =

Scottish scientist

Andrew Norman Meldrum (1876, Alloa – 1934, Edinburgh) was a Scottish scientist known for his work in organic chemistry and for his studies of the history of chemistry. It has been claimed that Meldrum's acid "is the only chemical to be named after a Scotsman."

He was educated at Robert Gordon's College in Aberdeen, the Royal College of Science in London, and the University of Aberdeen. He taught at the universities of Aberdeen, Liverpool, Sheffield and Manchester, and entered the Indian Education Service in 1912.

His appointments in India included the Chair of Chemistry at the Madhavlal Ranchodal Science Institute in Ahmedabad, and finally, from 1925 until his retirement in 1931, principal of the Royal Institute of Science (University of Bombay).

== Selected writings ==
- Meldrum, Andrew Norman (1906). Avogadro and Dalton. Edinburgh: James Thin. "dalton Meldrum."
- Meldrum, Andrew Norman (1908). "A β-lactonic acid from acetone and malonic acid". Journal of the Chemical Society, Transactions. 93: 598–601. doi:10.1039/CT9089300598.
- Meldrum, Andrew Norman (1910–1911). "The Development of the Atomic Theory. A series of articles from the Manchester Memoirs". Memoirs and Proceedings of the Manchester Literary & Philosophical Society. 54–55.
- Meldrum, Andrew Norman (1920). The Development of the Atomic Theory. London: H. Milford, Oxford University Press.
- Meldrum, Andrew Norman (1930). The Eighteenth Century Revolution in Science. The First Phase. London: Longmans, Green & Co., Ltd.
