= Alfred Hauptmann =

Alfred Hauptmann (August 29, 1881, in Gleiwitz, Upper Silesia – April 5, 1948, in Boston, Massachusetts) was a German-Jewish psychiatrist and neurologist.

His most important contribution remained the article written in 1912 on the effectiveness of the phenobarbital as an anti-epileptic. After his emigration, he and the internist Siegfried Thannhauser, who had also emigrated, described an autosomal dominant inherited myopathy for the first time in 1941, which is now known as Hauptmann-Thannhauser muscular dystrophy.

== Life and work ==
Hauptmann's professional career was primarily determined by his time with the well-known neurologist Max Nonne in Hamburg. During his life, Hauptmann's research focus was mainly on the neurological field. After working in Heidelberg and Hamburg, Hauptmann went to University of Freiburg Hospital . There he completed his habilitation in 1912. His most famous work, "Luminal in Epilepsy", was published in that year. After serving in World War I, Hauptmann resumed his work at the University of Freiburg, where he received an extraordinary professorship in 1918 and was senior physician at the mental hospital there, before taking over the chair in Halle in 1926 .

Hauptmann received the professorship for psychiatry at the University of Halle in 1926. He was a member of the German National Academy of Sciences Leopoldina. Until 1935 he worked as director of the psychiatric and mental hospital in Halle, but had to give up his chair in the course of the Nazi discriminatory laws and end his work as a doctor. The path to emigration, ultimately triggered by the temporary imprisonment in the Dachau concentration camp, led via Switzerland and England to the USA. He obtained a position at the Joseph H. Pratt Diagnostic Clinic in Boston, part of the Tufts University School of Medicine. Efforts with the help of the Rockefeller Foundation failed to find a position comparable to that he hold in Germany.

== Prize ==
The Alfred Hauptmann Prize for Epilepsy Research has been awarded since 1979, jointly by the German and Austrian Societies for Epileptology and the Swiss League Against Epilepsy since 2009.

== Main publications ==
- Luminal bei Epilepsie. Münchner Medizinische Wochenschrift 1912; 59: 1907–1909
- Hirndruck. Habilitationsschrift an der Universität Freiburg. Union deutsche Verlagsgesellschaft (Stuttgart) 1914
- (mit Siegfried Joseph Thannhauser): Muscular shortening and dystrophy. A heredofamilial disease. In: Archives of Neurology and Psychiatry 1941; Vol. 46: 654–664

== Bibliography ==
- Peter Emil Becker: Dominant autosomal muscular dystrophy with early contractures and cardio-myopathy (Hauptmann-Thannhauser). Hum Genet 1986; 74: 184
- M. Krasnianski; U. Ehrt; S. Neudecker; S. Zierz: Alfred Hauptmann, Siegfried Thannhauser, and an endangered muscular disorder. Archives of Neurology 2004; Vol. 61(7): 1139–1141
- E. Kumbier; K. Haack: Alfred Hauptmann – Schicksal eines deutsch-jüdischen Neurologen. Fortschritte der Neurologie, Psychiatrie Band 70, 2002, S. 204–209
- E. Kumbier, K. Haack: Wie aus einem Schlafmittel ein Antiepileptikum wurde – Die Entdeckung der antiepileptischen Wirkung von Phenobarbital durch Alfred Hauptmann. In: Aktuelle Neurologie. 31, 2004, S. 302–306, doi:10.1055/s-2003-817879.
- E. Kumbier; K. Haack: Pioneers in neurology: Alfred Hauptmann (1881–1948). Journal of Neurology 251: 1288–1289
- E. Müller: Alfred Hauptmann. In: Der Nervenarzt 1948; 19: 433
- Franz Günther von Stockert: Alfred Hauptmann (1881–1948). Arch Psych 1948; 180: 529–530
- Henrik Eberle: Die Martin-Luther-Universität in der Zeit des Nationalsozialismus. Mdv, Halle 2002, ISBN 3-89812-150-X, S. 328f
