= Malonyl chloride =

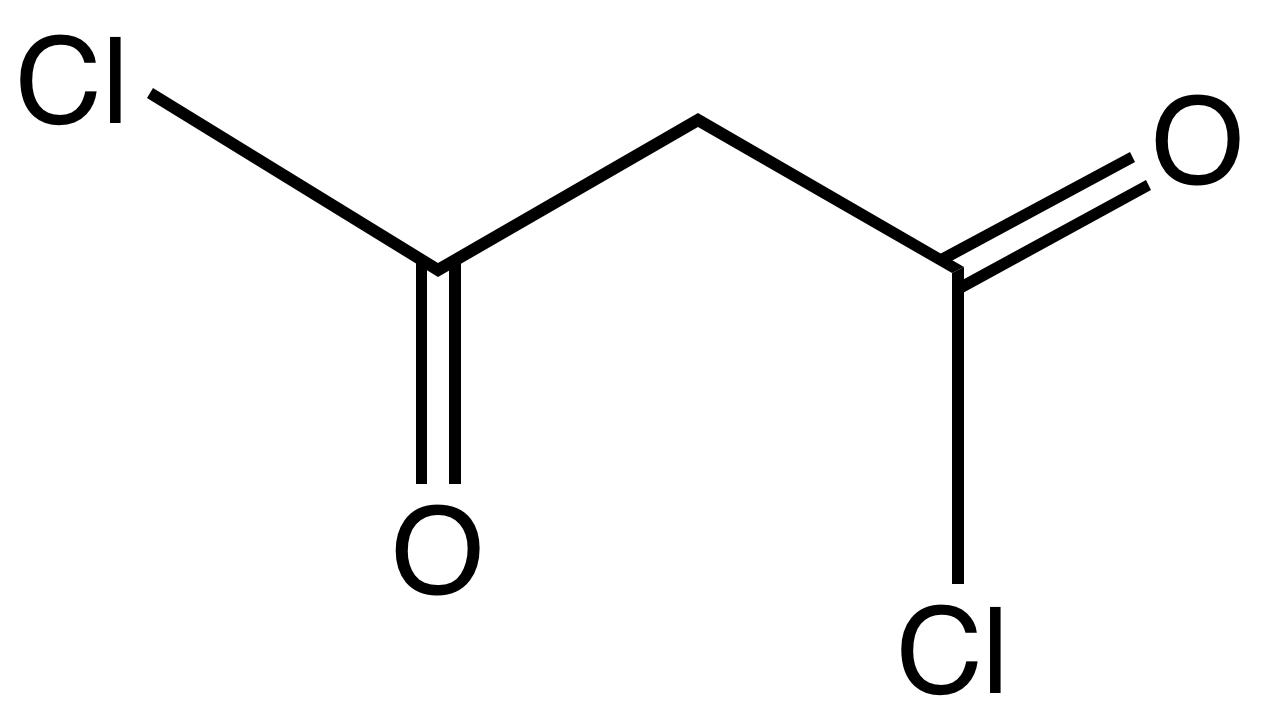

Names
- Preferred IUPAC name Propanedioyl dichloride

Identifiers
CAS Number	1663-67-8
3D model (JSmol)	Interactive image
ChemSpider	66875
ECHA InfoCard	100.015.249
EC Number	216-772-9
PubChem CID	74269
UNII	PDF3ZL8FTK
CompTox Dashboard (EPA)	DTXSID6061860
- InChI: InChI=1S/C3H2Cl2O2/c4-2(6)1-3(5)7/h1H2 Key: SXYFKXOFMCIXQW-UHFFFAOYSA-N
- SMILES: C(C(=O)Cl)C(=O)Cl

Properties
Chemical formula	C_{3}H_{2}Cl_{2}O_{2}
Molar mass	140.95 g·mol^{−1}
Appearance	colorless liquid
Boiling point	58 °C (136 °F; 331 K) 28 mm Hg

Hazards
- GHS labelling
Pictograms	(GHS02: Flammable) (GHS05: Corrosive)
Signal word	Danger
Hazard statements	H226, H314
Precautionary statements	P210, P233, P240, P241, P242, P243, P260, P264, P280, P301+P330+P331, P303+P361+P353, P304+P340, P305+P351+P338, P310, P321, P363, P370+P378, P403+P235, P405, P501
- Except where otherwise noted, data are given for materials in their standard state (at 25 °C [77 °F], 100 kPa). Infobox references

Malonyl chloride is the organic compound with the formula CH_{2}(COCl)_{2}. It is the acyl chloride derivative of malonic acid. It is a colorless liquid although samples are often deeply colored owing to impurities. The compound degrades at room temperature after a few days. It used as a reagent in organic synthesis.

== Synthesis and reactions ==
Malonyl chloride can be synthesized from malonic acid in thionyl chloride. As a bifunctional compound, it is used in the preparation of a number of cyclic compounds by diacylation. Heating in the presence of non-nucleophilic base gives the ketene derivative O=C=C(H)COCl.
