= Sodium chlorodifluoroacetate =

Identifiers
CAS Number	1895-39-2
3D model (JSmol)	Interactive image
ChemSpider	67266
ECHA InfoCard	100.015.988
EC Number	217-586-0
PubChem CID	2734985
UNII	ZAY4J838P2
CompTox Dashboard (EPA)	DTXSID1062049
- InChI: InChI=1S/C2HClF2O2.Na/c3-2(4,5)1(6)7;/h(H,6,7);/q;+1/p-1 Key: MRTAVLDNYYEJHK-UHFFFAOYSA-M
- SMILES: C(=O)(C(F)(F)Cl)[O-].[Na+]

Properties
Chemical formula	C_{2}ClF_{2}NaO_{2}
Molar mass	152.46 g·mol^{−1}
Appearance	white solid
Melting point	196–198 °C (385–388 °F; 469–471 K)

Hazards
- GHS labelling
Pictograms	(GHS07: Exclamation mark)
Signal word	Warning
Hazard statements	H315, H319, H335
Precautionary statements	P261, P264, P264+P265, P271, P280, P302+P352, P304+P340, P305+P351+P338, P319, P321, P332+P317, P337+P317, P362+P364, P403+P233, P405, P501
- Except where otherwise noted, data are given for materials in their standard state (at 25 °C [77 °F], 100 kPa). Infobox references

Sodium chlorodifluoroacetate is the organofluorine compound with the formula CF_{2}ClCO_{2}Na. It is a salt formed by neutralization of chlorodifluoroacetic acid with sodium hydroxide. The compound, a white solid, is of interest as a source of difluorocarbene:

CF_{2}ClCO_{2}Na → NaCl + CF_{2} + CO_{2}

This reaction is conducted in a hot solution also containing the substrate. Diglyme is a typical solvent. The conversion of sodium chlorodifluoroacetate is proposed to start with decarboxylation, which generates the carbanion ClF_{2}C^{−}.

One set of applications is difluorocyclopropanation. Thermal decomposition of sodium chlorodifluoroacetate in the presence of triphenylphosphine and an aldehyde allows for a Wittig-like reactions In this case, (C_{6}H_{5})_{3}P=CF_{2} is proposed as an intermediate.
