= Acetoacetic ester synthesis =

Chemical reaction

Reaction type	Coupling reaction

Reaction
Acetoacetic acid esters
+
R-X
+
(^{−}O-R & H_{3}O^{+})
↓
α-substituted acetone

Conditions
Temperature	+Δ

Identifiers
Organic Chemistry Portal	acetoacetic-ester-synthesis
RSC ontology ID	RXNO:0000107

Acetoacetic ester synthesis is a chemical reaction where ethyl acetoacetate is alkylated at the α-carbon to both carbonyl groups and then converted into a ketone, or more specifically an α-substituted acetone. This is very similar to malonic ester synthesis.

Acetoacetic ester synthesis equation

== Mechanism ==
A strong base deprotonates the dicarbonyl α-carbon. This carbon is preferred over the methyl carbon because the formed enolate is conjugated and thus resonance stabilized. The carbon then undergoes nucleophilic substitution. When heated with aqueous acid, the newly alkylated ester is hydrolyzed to a β-keto acid, which is decarboxylated to form a methyl ketone. The alkylated ester can undergo a second substitution to produce the dialkylated product.

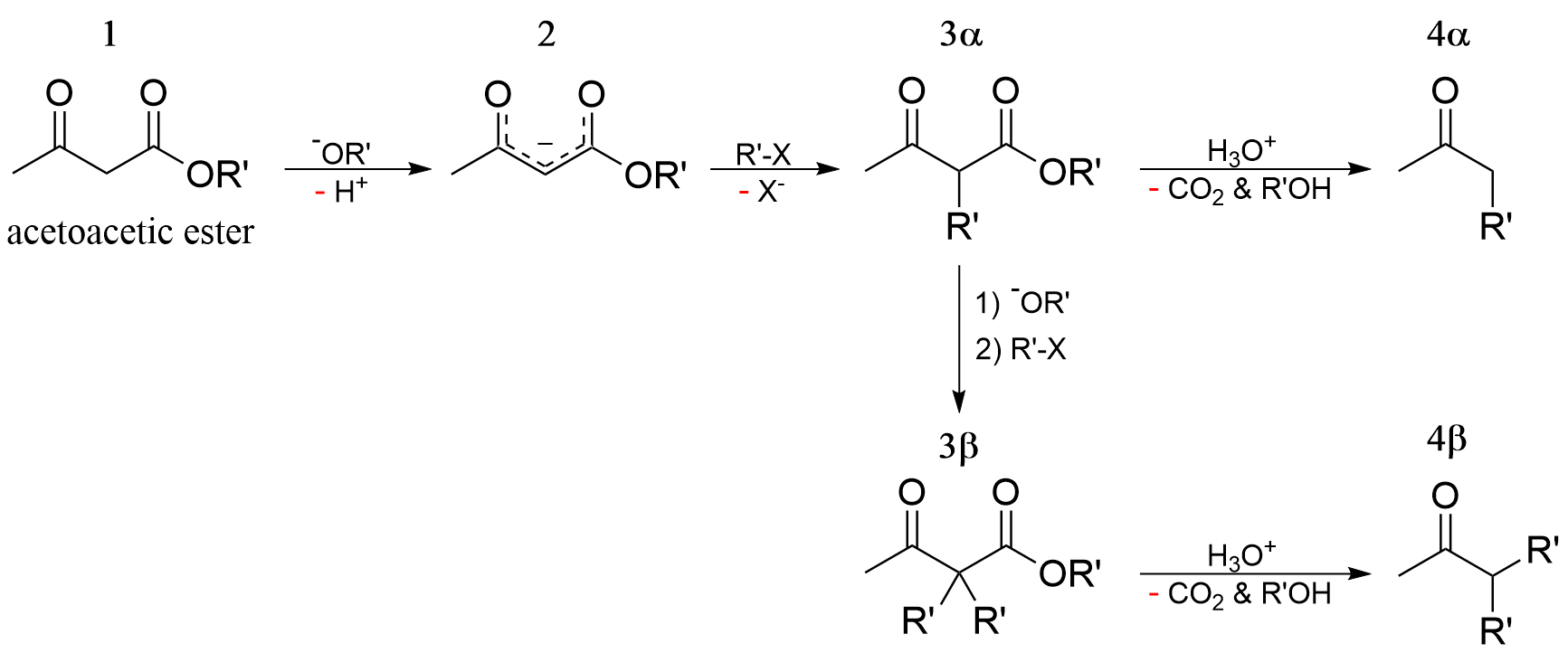

== Double deprotonation of ethyl acetoacetate ==
The classical acetoacetatic ester synthesis utilizes the 1:1 conjugate base. Ethyl acetoacetate is however diprotic:

CH_{3}C(O)CH_{2}CO_{2}Et + NaH → CH_{3}C(O)CH(Na)CO_{2}Et + H_{2}
CH_{3}C(O)CH(Na)CO_{2}Et + BuLi → LiCH_{2}C(O)CH(Na)CO_{2}Et + BuH

The dianion (i.e., LiCH_{2}C(O)CH(Na)CO_{2}Et) adds electrophile to the terminal carbon as depicted in the following simplified form:

LiCH_{2}C(O)CH(Na)CO_{2}Et + RX → RCH_{2}C(O)CH(Na)CO_{2}Et + LiX

== See also ==
- Malonic ester synthesis
