= Alloknesis =

Unexpected itching sensation

Alloknesis is an abnormal sensory state where stimuli that do not ordinarily evoke itch (such as the light touch of clothing) cause itching. It is often, but not always associated with atopic dermatitis, and is generally diagnosed using von Frey filaments and questionnaires, though these methods are considered to be of limited usefulness. Causes can range from mechanical pathways involving the interaction between low-threshold mechanoreceptors and spinal interneurons, to chemical pathways via the activation of the mechanosensitive ion channel PIEZO1; though both are poorly understood.
