= Difluorocarbene =

Names
- Preferred IUPAC name Difluoromethylidene
- Other names Difluoromethylene

Identifiers
| CAS Number | 2154-59-8 |
| ECHA InfoCard | 100.128.429 |
| PubChem CID | 6432238 |
| CompTox Dashboard (EPA) | DTXSID901045808 |
- InChI: InChI=1S/CF2/c2-1-3 Key: LTVOKYUPTHZZQH-UHFFFAOYSA-N
- SMILES: [C](F)F

Properties
| Chemical formula | CF_{2} |
| Molar mass | 50.008 g·mol^{−1} |

Related compounds
| Other anions | Methylene; Dichlorocarbene; Dibromocarbene; Diiodocarbene |
| Other cations | Difluorosilylene; Difluorogermylene; Stannous fluoride Plumbous fluoride |
- Except where otherwise noted, data are given for materials in their standard state (at 25 °C [77 °F], 100 kPa). Infobox references

Difluorocarbene is the chemical compound with formula CF_{2}. It has a short half-life, 0.5 and 20 ms, in solution and in the gas phase, respectively. Although highly reactive, difluorocarbene is an intermediate in the production of tetrafluoroethylene, which is produced on an industrial scale as the precursor to Teflon (PTFE).

== Bonding in difluorocarbene ==
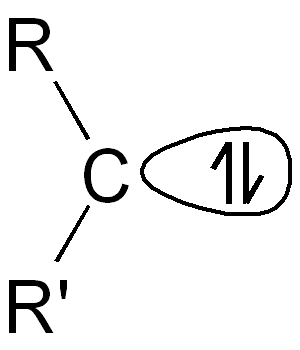
Fig. 1: The electron distribution in a singlet carbene. The empty p-orbital perpendicular to the plane of the other bonds is not shown

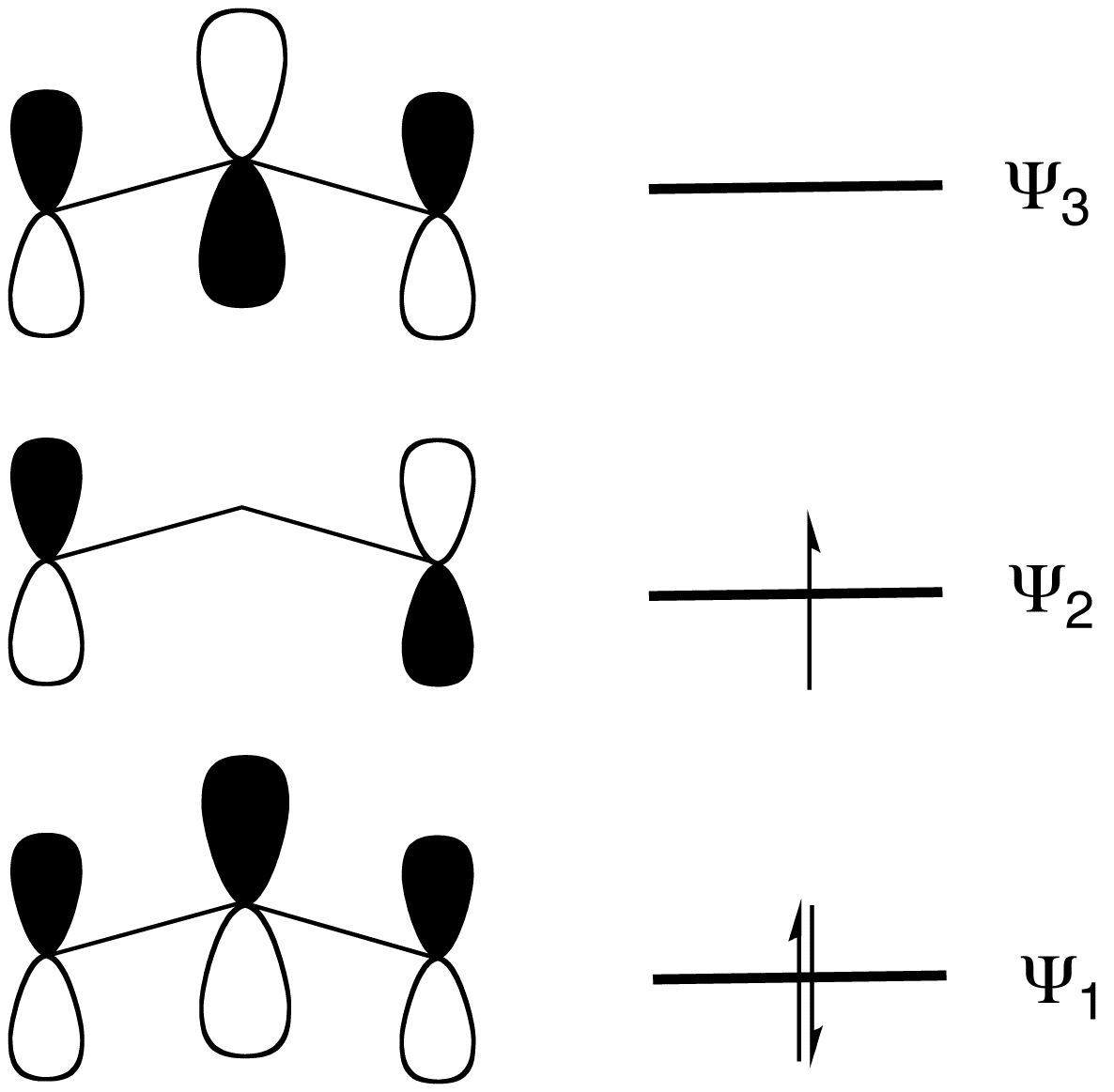
Fig. 2: Molecular orbitals for three contributing p-orbitals

In general, carbenes exist in either singlet or triplet states, which are often quite close in energy. Singlet carbenes have spin-paired electrons and a higher energy empty 2p orbital. In a triplet carbene, one electron occupies the hybrid orbital and the other is promoted to the 2p orbital. For most carbenes, the triplet state is more stable than the corresponding singlet. In the case of fluorinated carbenes, however, the singlet is lower energy than the triplet. The difference in energy between the singlet ground state and the first excited triplet state is 56.6 kcal per mol. In singlet difluorocarbene, the C-F bond length is measured as 1.300 Å and F-C-F bond angle is measured as 104.94° (almost tetrahedral). On the other hand for the triplet state, the C-F bond length is measured as 1.320 Å and F-C-F bond angle is measured as 122.3° (slightly more, due to steric repulsion, than expected in an sp^{2} carbon).

The reasoning for the difference between the two carbenes is outlined in the two figures on the left. Figure 1 depicts the electron distribution in a singlet carbene, figure 2 shows the orbitals available to π-electrons. The molecular orbitals are built from an empty p-orbital on the central carbon atom and two orbitals on the fluorine atoms. Four electrons, the carbon orbital is empty, the fluorine orbitals both carry two electrons, need to find a place, thus filling the lower two of the MO-set. The non-bonding electrons of the carbene now need to be placed either double in the rather low energy sp_{2} orbital on carbon or in the highest anti-bonding level of the MO-system. Clearly in CF_{2} the singlet is the most favorable state.

In ordinary carbene, no π-MO-system is present, so the two non-bonding electrons can be placed in the two non-bonding orbitals on the carbon atom. Here avoiding the double negative charge in one orbital leads to a triplet carbene.

== Preparation ==
Thermolysis of sodium chlorodifluoroacetate was the first route to difluorocarbene. The generation of difluorocarbene involves loss of carbon dioxide and chloride.

CF_{2}ClCO_{2}Na → CO_{2} + NaCl + CF_{2}

Phosphorus pentafluoride reversibly stores difluorocarbene:

PF_{5} + 3 CF_{2} ⇌ F_{2}P(CF_{3})_{3}

Thermal decomposition of sodium chlorodifluoroacetate in the presence of triphenylphosphine and an aldehyde allows for a Wittig-like reactions In this case, (C_{6}H_{5})_{3}P=CF_{2} is proposed as an intermediate.

Alternatively, dehydrohalogenation of chlorodifluoromethane or bromodifluoromethane using alkoxides or alkyllithium also produces difluorocarbene:

NaOR + HCF_{2}Cl → CF_{2}+ HOR + NaCl

A variant of this reaction is using ethylene oxide in conjunction with a catalytic amount of quaternary ammonium halide at elevated temperature. In equilibrium a small amount of β-haloalkoxide is present that acts as a base. This avoids an excess concentration of base that will destroy the carbene just formed.

Thermolysis of hexafluoropropylenoxide at 190 °C gives difluorocarbene and trifluoroacetyl fluoride. This is an attractive method for the synthesis of difluorocyclopropanes as hexafluoropropylenoxide is inexpensive and the byproduct trifluoroacetyl fluoride is a gas.

== Application ==
Difluorocarbene is used to generate geminal difluorocyclopropanes.

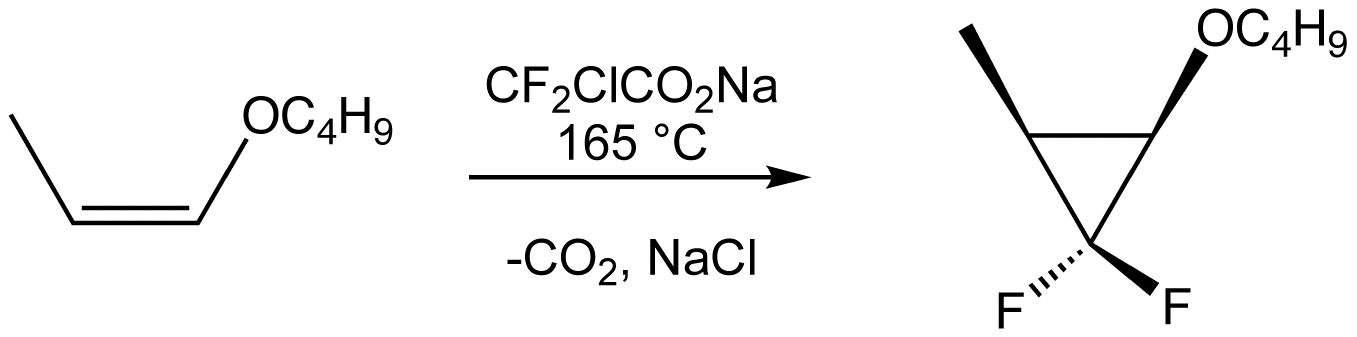

== See also ==
- Dichlorocarbene
