= Malonic acid =

Carboxylic acid with chemical formula CH2(COOH)2

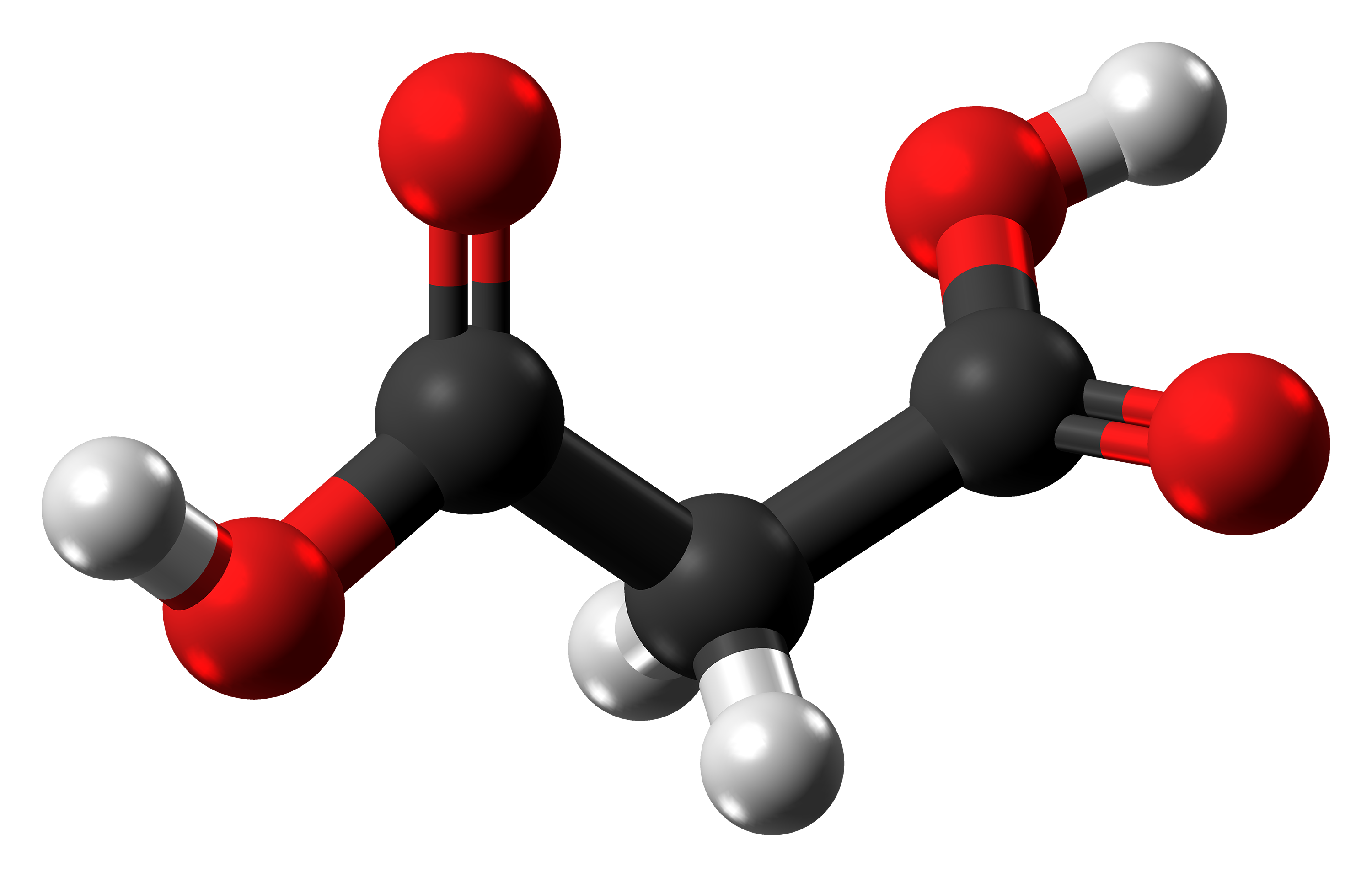

Names
- Preferred IUPAC name Propanedioic acid
- Other names Methanedicarboxylic acid

Identifiers
| CAS Number | 141-82-2 |
| 3D model (JSmol) | Interactive image; Interactive image |
| ChEBI | CHEBI:30794 |
| ChEMBL | ChEMBL7942 |
| ChemSpider | 844 |
| DrugBank | DB02175 |
| ECHA InfoCard | 100.005.003 |
| PubChem CID | 867 |
| UNII | 9KX7ZMG0MK |
| CompTox Dashboard (EPA) | DTXSID7021659 |
- InChI: InChI=1S/C3H4O4/c4-2(5)1-3(6)7/h1H2,(H,4,5)(H,6,7) Key: OFOBLEOULBTSOW-UHFFFAOYSA-N; InChI=1/C3H4O4/c4-2(5)1-3(6)7/h1H2,(H,4,5)(H,6,7) Key: OFOBLEOULBTSOW-UHFFFAOYAJ
- SMILES: O=C(O)CC(O)=O; C(C(=O)O)C(=O)O

Properties
| Chemical formula | C_{3}H_{4}O_{4} |
| Molar mass | 104.061 g·mol^{−1} |
| Density | 1.619 g/cm^{3} |
| Melting point | 135 to 137 °C (275 to 279 °F; 408 to 410 K) (decomposes) |
| Boiling point | decomposes |
| Solubility in water | 763 g/L |
| Acidity (pK_{a}) | pK_{a1} = 2.83 pK_{a2} = 5.69 |
| Magnetic susceptibility (χ) | −46.3·10^{−6} cm^{3}/mol |

Related compounds
| Other anions | Malonate |
| Related carboxylic acids | Oxalic acid Propionic acid Succinic acid Fumaric acid |
| Related compounds | Malondialdehyde; Dimethyl malonate |

Hazards
| Safety data sheet (SDS) | External MSDS |
- Except where otherwise noted, data are given for materials in their standard state (at 25 °C [77 °F], 100 kPa). Infobox references

Malonic acid is a dicarboxylic acid with structure CH_{2}(COOH)_{2}. The ionized form of malonic acid, as well as its esters and salts, are known as malonates. For example, diethyl malonate is malonic acid's diethyl ester. The name originates from the Greek word μᾶλον (malon) meaning 'apple'.

== History ==
Malonic acid is a naturally occurring substance found in many fruits and vegetables. There is a suggestion that citrus fruits produced in organic farming contain higher levels of malonic acid than fruits produced in conventional agriculture.

Malonic acid was first prepared in 1858 by the French chemist Victor Dessaignes via the oxidation of malic acid.

Hermann Kolbe and Hugo Müller independently discovered how to synthesize malonic acid from propionic acid, and decided to publish their results back-to-back in the Chemical Society journal in 1864. This led to priority dispute with Hans Hübner and Maxwell Simpson who had independently published preliminary results on related reactions.

== Structure and preparation ==
The structure has been determined by X-ray crystallography and extensive property data including for condensed phase thermochemistry are available from the National Institute of Standards and Technology. A classical preparation of malonic acid starts from chloroacetic acid:

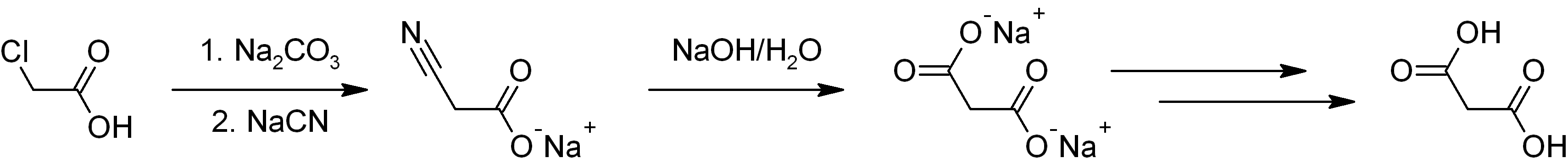
Preparation of malonic acid from chloroacetic acid.

Sodium carbonate generates the sodium salt, which is then reacted with sodium cyanide to provide the sodium salt of cyanoacetic acid via a nucleophilic substitution. The nitrile group can be hydrolyzed with sodium hydroxide to sodium malonate, and acidification affords malonic acid. Industrially, however, malonic acid is produced by hydrolysis of dimethyl malonate or diethyl malonate. It has also been produced through fermentation of glucose.

== Reactions ==
Malonic acid reacts as a typical carboxylic acid forming amide, ester, and chloride derivatives. Malonic anhydride can be used as an intermediate to mono-ester or amide derivatives, while malonyl chloride is most useful to obtain diesters or diamides. In a well-known reaction, malonic acid condenses with urea to form barbituric acid. Malonic acid may also be condensed with acetone to form Meldrum's acid, a versatile intermediate in further transformations. The esters of malonic acid are also used as a -CH_{2}COOH synthon in the malonic ester synthesis.

=== Oscillating reactions ===
Malonic acid is a key component in both the Briggs–Rauscher reaction and the Belousov-Zhabotinsky reaction, two classic examples of an oscillating chemical reaction.

=== Knoevenagel condensation ===
Malonic acid is used to prepare a,b-unsaturated carboxylic acids by condensation and decarboxylation. Cinnamic acids are prepared in this way:

CH_{2}(CO_{2}H)_{2} + ArCHO → ArCH=CHCO_{2}H + H_{2}O + CO_{2}

In this, the so-called Knoevenagel condensation, malonic acid condenses with the carbonyl group of an aldehyde or ketone, followed by a decarboxylation.

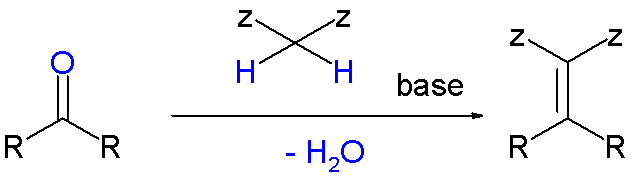
Z=COOH (malonic acid) or Z=COOR' (malonate ester)

When malonic acid is condensed in hot pyridine, the condensation is accompanied by decarboxylation, the so-called Doebner modification.

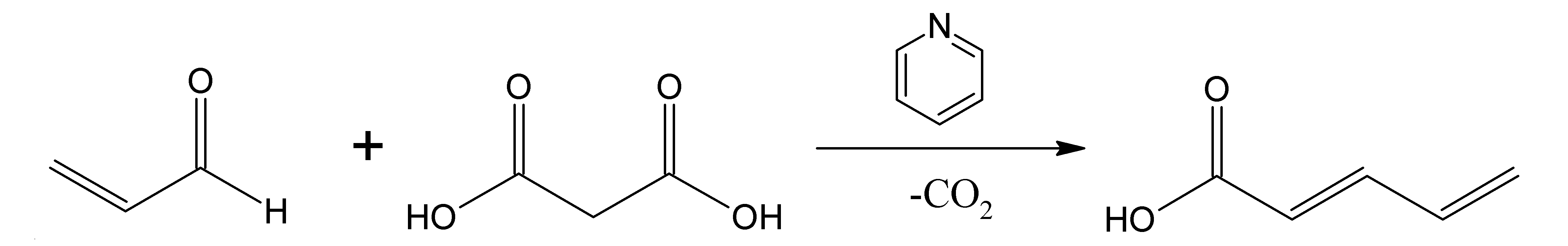
The Doebner modification of the Knoevenagel condensation.

=== Preparation of carbon suboxide ===
Malonic acid does not readily form an anhydride, dehydration gives carbon suboxide instead:

CH_{2}(CO_{2}H)_{2} → O=C=C=C=O + 2 H_{2}O

The transformation is achieved by warming a dry mixture of phosphorus pentoxide (P_{4}O_{10}) and malonic acid. It reacts in a similar way to malonic anhydride, forming malonates.

== Applications ==
Malonic acid is a precursor to specialty polyesters. It can be converted into 1,3-propanediol for use in polyesters and polymers (whose usefulness is unclear though). It can also be a component in alkyd resins, which are used in a number of coatings applications for protecting against damage caused by UV light, oxidation, and corrosion. One application of malonic acid is in the coatings industry as a crosslinker for low-temperature cure powder coatings, which are becoming increasingly valuable for heat sensitive substrates and a desire to speed up the coatings process. The global coatings market for automobiles was estimated to be $18.59 billion in 2014 with projected combined annual growth rate of 5.1% through 2022.

It is used in a number of manufacturing processes as a high value specialty chemical including the electronics industry, flavors and fragrances industry, specialty solvents, polymer crosslinking, and pharmaceutical industry. In 2004, annual global production of malonic acid and related diesters was over 20,000 metric tons. Potential growth of these markets could result from advances in industrial biotechnology that seeks to displace petroleum-based chemicals in industrial applications.

In 2004, malonic acid was listed by the US Department of Energy as one of the top 30 chemicals to be produced from biomass.

In food and drug applications, malonic acid can be used to control acidity, either as an excipient in pharmaceutical formulation or natural preservative additive for foods.

Malonic acid is used as a building block chemical to produce numerous valuable compounds, including the flavor and fragrance compounds gamma-nonalactone, cinnamic acid, and the pharmaceutical compound valproate.

Malonic acid (up to 37.5% w/w) has been used to cross-link corn and potato starches to produce a biodegradable thermoplastic; the process is performed in water using non-toxic catalysts. Starch-based polymers comprised 38% of the global biodegradable polymers market in 2014 with food packaging, foam packaging, and compost bags as the largest end-use segments.

Eastman Kodak company and others use malonic acid and derivatives as a surgical adhesive.

== Pathology ==
If elevated malonic acid levels are accompanied by elevated methylmalonic acid levels, this may indicate the metabolic disease combined malonic and methylmalonic aciduria (CMAMMA). By calculating the malonic acid to methylmalonic acid ratio in blood plasma, CMAMMA can be distinguished from classic methylmalonic acidemia.

== Biochemistry ==
Malonic acid is the classic example of a competitive inhibitor of the enzyme succinate dehydrogenase (complex II), in the respiratory electron transport chain. It binds to the active site of the enzyme without reacting, competing with the usual substrate succinate but lacking the -CH_{2}CH_{2}- group required for dehydrogenation. This observation was used to deduce the structure of the active site in succinate dehydrogenase. Inhibition of this enzyme decreases cellular respiration. Since malonic acid is a natural component of many foods, it is present in mammals including humans.

In mammals, acyl-CoA synthetase family member 3 (ACSF3) detoxifies malonic acid by converting it into malonyl-CoA. Along with malonyl-CoA derived from acetyl-CoA by mitochondrial acetyl-CoA carboxylase 1 (mtACC1), this contributes to the mitochondrial malonyl-CoA pool, which is required for lysine malonylation and mitochondrial fatty acid synthesis (mtFAS). In the cytosol, malonyl-CoA is likewise generated from acetyl-CoA by acetyl-CoA carboxylase. In both cytosolic and mitochondrial fatty acid synthesis, malonyl-CoA transfers its malonate group (C2) to an acyl carrier protein (ACP) to be added to a fatty acid chain.

== Salts and esters ==
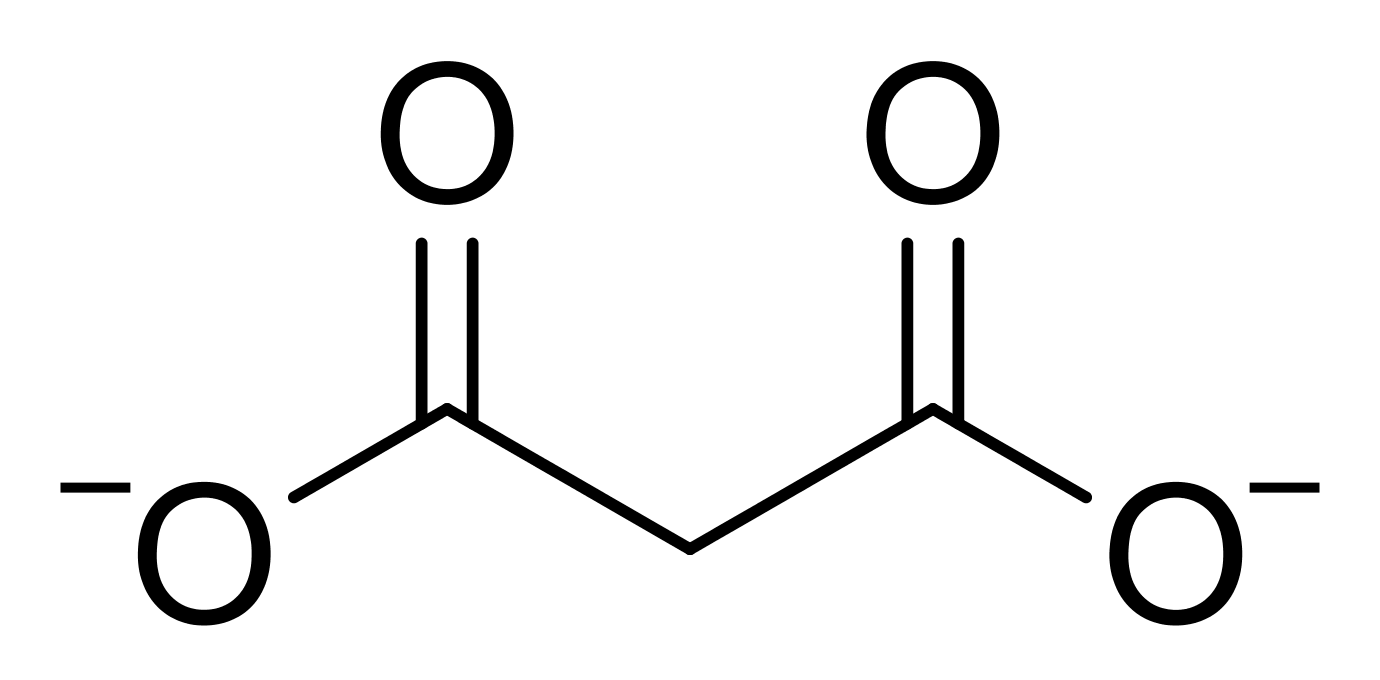
Chemical structure of the malonate dianion.

Malonic acid is diprotic; that is, it can donate two protons per molecule. Its first pK_{a} is 2.8 and the second is 5.7. Thus the malonate ion can be HOOCCH_{2}COO^{−} or CH_{2}(COO)_{2}^{2−}. Malonate or propanedioate compounds include salts and esters of malonic acid, such as

- Diethyl malonate
- Dimethyl malonate
- Disodium malonate
- Malonyl-CoA
