= Diethyl malonate =

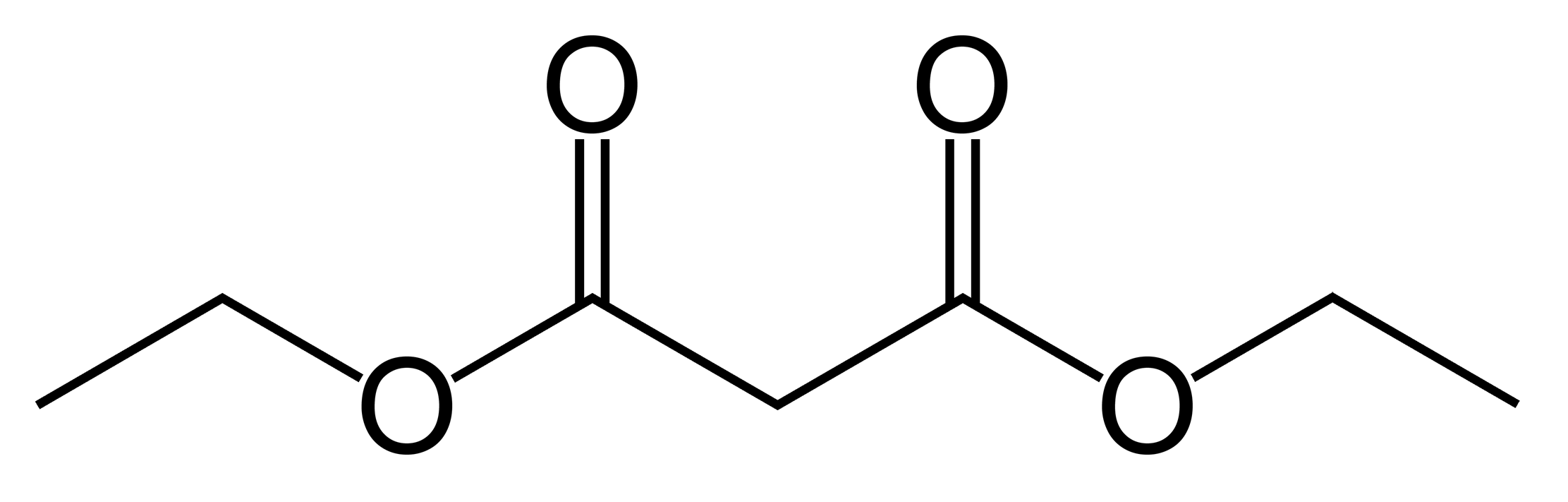

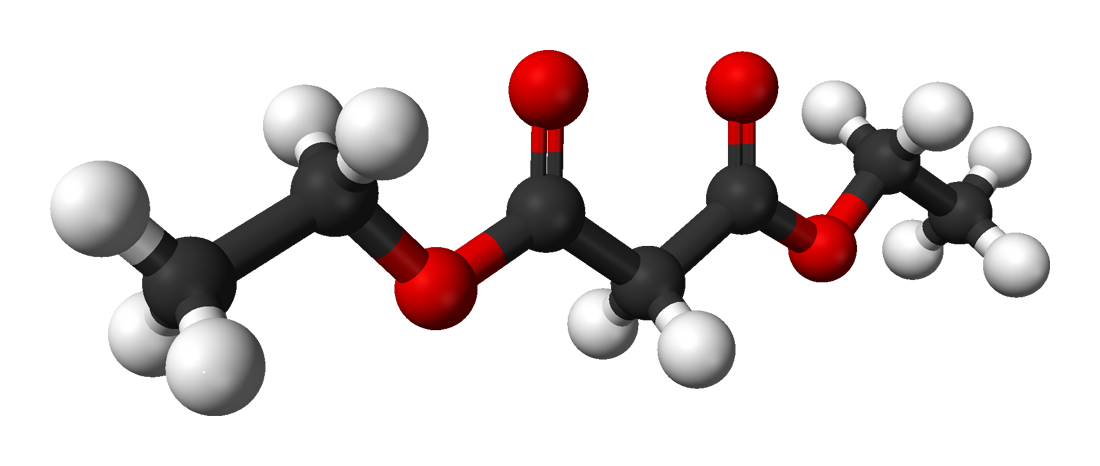

Names
- IUPAC name Diethyl malonate
- Preferred IUPAC name Diethyl propanedioate
- Other names Diethyl malonate

Identifiers
CAS Number	105-53-3
3D model (JSmol)	Interactive image
Abbreviations	DEM
Beilstein Reference	774687
ChEBI	CHEBI:391281
ChEMBL	ChEMBL177114
ChemSpider	13863636
ECHA InfoCard	100.003.006
EC Number	203-305-9
MeSH	Diethyl+malonate
PubChem CID	7761
RTECS number	OO0700000
UNII	53A58PA183
CompTox Dashboard (EPA)	DTXSID7021863
- InChI: InChI=1S/C7H12O4/c1-3-10-6(8)5-7(9)11-4-2/h3-5H2,1-2H3 Key: IYXGSMUGOJNHAZ-UHFFFAOYSA-N; InChI=1/C7H12O4/c1-3-10-6(8)5-7(9)11-4-2/h3-5H2,1-2H3 Key: IYXGSMUGOJNHAZ-UHFFFAOYAC
- SMILES: O=C(OCC)CC(=O)OCC

Properties
Chemical formula	C_{7}H_{12}O_{4}
Molar mass	160.17 g/mol
Appearance	colourless liquid
Density	1.05 g/cm^{3}, liquid
Melting point	−50 °C (−58 °F; 223 K)
Boiling point	199 °C (390 °F; 472 K)
Solubility in water	negligible
Acidity (pK_{a})	14; 16.37 (DMSO)
Magnetic susceptibility (χ)	−92.6·10^{−6} cm^{3}/mol

Structure
Dipole moment	2.54 D (liquid)

Thermochemistry
Heat capacity (C)	285.0 J·mol^{−1}·K^{−1}

Hazards
- Occupational safety and health (OHS/OSH)
Main hazards	Harmful (X), Flammable (F)
Flash point	93 °C (199 °F; 366 K)
Safety data sheet (SDS)	Oxford University MSDS

Related compounds
Related compounds	Dimethyl malonate Malonic acid
- Except where otherwise noted, data are given for materials in their standard state (at 25 °C [77 °F], 100 kPa). verify (what is ?) Infobox references

Diethyl malonate, also known as DEM, is the diethyl ester of malonic acid. It occurs naturally in grapes and strawberries as a colourless liquid with an apple-like odour, and is used in perfumes. It is also used to synthesize other compounds such as barbiturates, artificial flavourings, vitamin B_{1}, and vitamin B_{6}.

== Structure and properties ==
Malonic acid is a rather simple dicarboxylic acid, with two carboxyl groups close together. In forming diethyl malonate from malonic acid, the hydroxyl group (−OH) on both of the carboxyl groups is replaced by an ethoxy group (−OEt; −OCH_{2}CH_{3}). The methylene group (−CH_{2}−) in the middle of the malonic part of the diethyl malonate molecule is neighboured by two carbonyl groups (−C(=O)−).

The hydrogen atoms on the carbon adjacent to the carbonyl group in a molecule are significantly more acidic than hydrogen atoms on a carbon adjacent to alkyl groups (up to 30 orders of magnitude). (This is known as the α position with respect to the carbonyl.) The hydrogen atoms on a carbon adjacent to two carbonyl groups are even more acidic because the carbonyl groups help stabilize the carbanion resulting from the removal of a proton from the methylene group between them. The extent of resonance stabilization of this compound's conjugate base is suggested by the three resonance forms below:

== Preparation ==
Diethyl malonate is produced from the reaction of the sodium salt of chloroacetic acid with sodium cyanide, which produces the nitrile. This intermediate is then treated with ethanol in the presence of acid catalyst:

ClCH_{2}CO_{2}Na + NaCN → NCCH_{2}CO_{2}Na + NaCl
NCCH_{2}CO_{2}Na + 2 C_{2}H_{5}OH + 2 HCl → C_{2}H_{5}O_{2}CCH_{2}CO_{2}C_{2}H_{5} + NH_{4}Cl + NaCl

Alternatively, sodium chloroacetate undergoes carboxyesterification by treatment with carbon monoxide and ethanol:

ClCH_{2}CO_{2}Na + CO + 2 C_{2}H_{5}OH → C_{2}H_{5}O_{2}CCH_{2}CO_{2}C_{2}H_{5} + NaCl

Dicobalt octacarbonyl is employed as the catalyst.

== Reactions ==
=== Malonic ester synthesis ===
One of the principal uses of this compound is in the malonic ester synthesis. The carbanion (2) formed by reacting diethyl malonate (1) with a suitable base can be alkylated with a suitable electrophile. This alkylated 1,3-dicarbonyl compound (3) readily undergoes decarboxylation with loss of carbon dioxide, to give a substituted acetic acid (4):

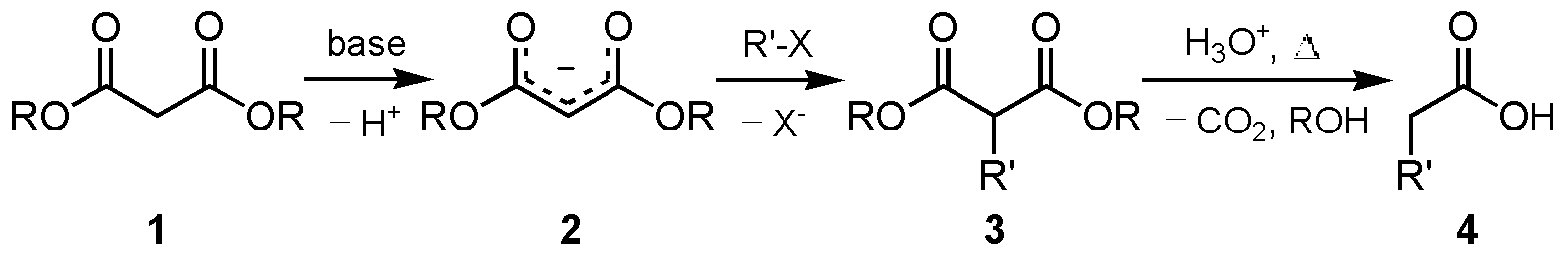

In general, salts of the alkoxide anion whose alkyl part corresponds to the one used in the above alkylation are preferred as the base. The use of a conventional base may give base hydrolysis products – for example, sodium hydroxide would simply produce sodium malonate and the alcohol, while other alkoxide salts will cause scrambling by transesterification. Only the "same" alkoxide anion as the one that one used to alkylate the deprotonated active methylenic site will prevent both base hydrolysis and transesterification.

=== Other reactions ===
Like many other esters, this compound undergoes the Claisen ester condensations. The advantage of using this compound is that unwanted self-condensation reactions are avoided. Like other esters, this compound undergoes bromination at the alpha position.

Diethyl malonate can be nitrosated with excess sodium nitrite in acetic acid to afford diethyl oximinomalonate, catalytic hydrogenolysis of which in ethanol over Pd/C affords diethyl aminomalonate (DEAM). DEAM can be acetylated to produce diethyl acetamidomalonate (useful in amino-acid synthesis), or can be added with 3-substituted 2,4-diketones to boiling acetic acid to afford in maximal yield variously substituted ethyl pyrrole-2-carboxylates of interest for porphyrin synthesis.

== Applications ==
Naftidrofuryl, a vasodilator, is produced from diethyl malonate in ways that illustrate classical reactions: alkylations and decarboxylation.

Diethyl malonate is used in the preparation of several medicinally useful compounds including vigabatrin, phenylbutazone, nalidixic acid, and rebamipide. Several pesticides are also produced from diethylmalonate, including sethoxydim and the derivatives of 2-amino-4-chloro-6-methoxypyrimidine.

In perfumery, diethyl malonate contributes a "sweet, fruity, green, apple" aroma.
