= Decarboxylation =

Chemical reaction that removes a carboxyl group and releases carbon dioxide

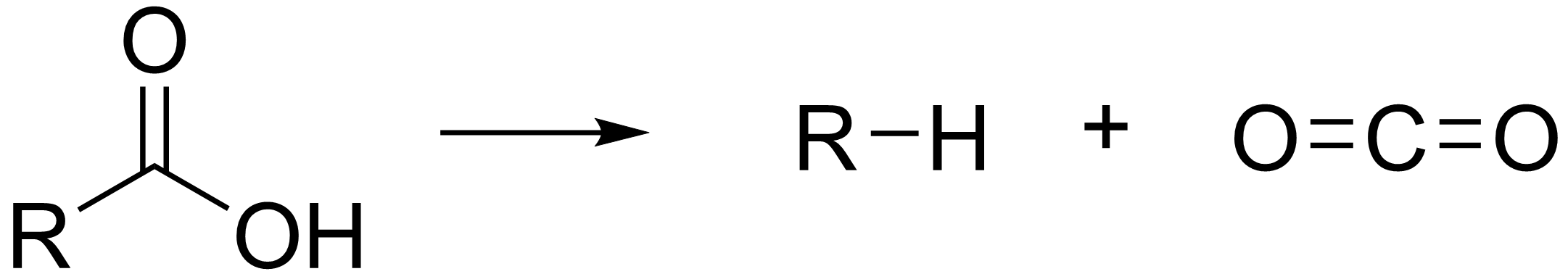
Decarboxylation

Decarboxylation is a chemical reaction that removes a carboxyl group and releases carbon dioxide (CO_{2}). Usually the term refers to a reaction of carboxylic acids, removing a carbon atom from a carbon chain. The reverse process, which is the first chemical step in photosynthesis, is called carboxylation, the addition of CO_{2} to a compound. Enzymes that catalyze decarboxylations are called decarboxylases or, more formally, carboxy-lyases (EC number 4.1.1).

== In organic chemistry ==
The term decarboxylation usually means replacement of a carboxyl group (−C(O)OH) with a hydrogen atom:

RCO_{2}H → RH + CO_{2}

Decarboxylation is one of the oldest known organic reactions. It is one of the processes assumed to accompany pyrolysis and destructive distillation.

Overall, decarboxylation depends upon stability of the carbanion synthon R^{−}, although the anion may not be a true chemical intermediate. Typically, carboxylic acids decarboxylate slowly, but carboxylic acids with an α electron-withdrawing group (e.g. β‑keto acids, β‑nitriles, α‑nitro acids, or arylcarboxylic acids) decarboxylate easily. Decarboxylation of sodium chlorodifluoroacetate generates difluorocarbene:

CF_{2}ClCO_{2}Na → NaCl + CF_{2} + CO_{2}

Decarboxylations are important in the malonic and acetoacetic ester synthesis. The Knoevenagel condensation and they allow keto acids serve as a stabilizing protecting group for carboxylic acid enols.

For the free acids, conditions that deprotonate the carboxyl group (possibly protonating the electron-withdrawing group to form a zwitterionic tautomer) accelerate decarboxylation. A strong base is key to ketonization, in which a pair of carboxylic acids combine to the eponymous functional group:

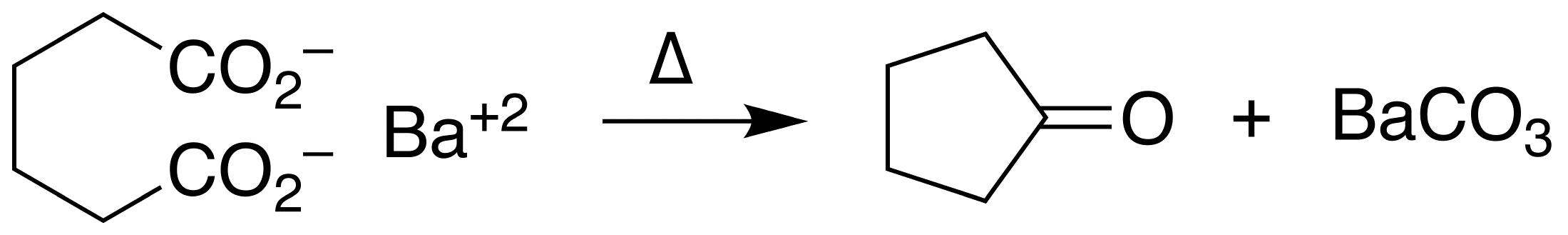

Transition metal salts, especially copper compounds, facilitate decarboxylation via carboxylate complex intermediates. Metals that catalyze cross-coupling reactions thus treat aryl carboxylates as an aryl anion synthon; this synthetic strategy is the decarboxylative cross-coupling reaction.

Upon heating in cyclohexanone, amino acids decarboxylate. In the related Hammick reaction, uncatalyzed decarboxylation of a picolinic acid gives a stable carbene that attacks a carbonyl electrophile.

Oxidative decarboxylations are generally radical reactions. These include the Kolbe electrolysis and Hunsdiecker-Kochi reactions. The Barton decarboxylation is an unusual radical reductive decarboxylation.

As described above, most decarboxylations start with a carboxylic acid or its alkali metal salt, but the Krapcho decarboxylation starts with methyl esters. In this case, the reaction begins with halide-mediated cleavage of the ester, forming the carboxylate.

== In biochemistry ==
Decarboxylations are pervasive in biology. They are often classified according to the cofactors that catalyze the transformations. Biotin-coupled processes effect the decarboxylation of malonyl-CoA to acetyl-CoA. Thiamine (T:) is the active component for decarboxylation of alpha-ketoacids, including pyruvate:

T: + RC(O)CO_{2}H → T=C(OH)R + CO_{2}
T=C(OH)R + R'COOH → T! : + RC(O)CH(OH)R'

Pyridoxal phosphate promotes decarboxylation of amino acids. Flavin-dependent decarboxylases are involved in transformations of cysteine. Iron-based hydroxylases operate by reductive activation of O_{2} using the decarboxylation of alpha-ketoglutarate as an electron donor. The decarboxylation can be depicted as such:

RC(O)CO_{2}Fe O_{2} → RCO_{2}Fe{IV}=O + CO_{2}
RCO_{2}Fe=O + R'H → RCO_{2}Fe + R'OH

=== Decarboxylation of amino acids ===
Common biosynthetic oxidative decarboxylations of amino acids to amines are:

- tryptophan to tryptamine
- phenylalanine to phenylethylamine
- tyrosine to tyramine
- histidine to histamine
- serine to ethanolamine
- glutamic acid to GABA
- lysine to cadaverine
- arginine to agmatine
- ornithine to putrescine
- 5-HTP to serotonin
- L-DOPA to dopamine

Other decarboxylation reactions from the citric acid cycle include:

- pyruvate to acetyl-CoA (see pyruvate decarboxylation)
- oxalosuccinate to α-ketoglutarate
- α-ketoglutarate to succinyl-CoA.

=== Fatty acid synthesis ===
Synthesis of saturated fatty acids via fatty acid synthase II in E. coli

Straight-chain fatty acid synthesis occurs by recurring reactions involving decarboxylation of malonyl-CoA.

== Case studies ==
Tetrahydrocannabinolic acid. The decarboxylation of this compound by heat is essential for the psychoactive effect of cannabis when consumed and depends on conversion of the enol to a keto group when the alpha carbon is protonated.

Upon heating, Δ9-tetrahydrocannabinolic acid decarboxylates to give the psychoactive compound Δ9-tetrahydrocannabinol. When cannabis is heated in vacuum, the decarboxylation of tetrahydrocannabinolic acid (THCA) appears to follow first order kinetics. The log fraction of THCA present decreases steadily over time, and the rate of decrease varies according to temperature. At 10-degree increments from 100 to 140 °C, half of the THCA is consumed in 30, 11, 6, 3, and 2 minutes; hence the rate constant follows Arrhenius' law, ranging between 10^{−8} and 10^{−5} in a linear log–log relationship with inverse temperature. However, modelling of decarboxylation of salicylic acid with a water molecule had suggested an activation barrier of 150 kJ/mol for a single molecule in solvent, much too high for the observed rate. Therefore, it was concluded that this reaction, conducted in the solid phase in plant material with a high fraction of carboxylic acids, follows pseudo–first-order kinetics in which a nearby carboxylic acid precipitates without affecting the observed rate constant. Two transition states corresponding to indirect and direct keto-enol routes are possible, with energies of 93 and 104 kJ/mol. Both intermediates involve protonation of the alpha carbon, disrupting one of the double bonds of the aromatic ring and permitting the beta-keto group (which takes the form of an enol in THCA and THC) to participate in decarboxylation.

In beverages stored for long periods, very small amounts of benzene may form from benzoic acid by decarboxylation catalyzed by the presence of ascorbic acid.

The addition of catalytic amounts of cyclohexenone has been reported to catalyze the decarboxylation of amino acids. However, using such catalysts may also yield an amount of unwanted by-products.
