= Malonic ester synthesis =

Type of chemical reaction

Reaction type	Coupling reaction

Reaction
Malonic acid esters
+
R-X
+
(^{−}O-R & H_{3}O^{+})
↓
Substituted Acetic Acid
+
CO_{2}
+
R-OH

Conditions
Temperature	+Δ

Identifiers
Organic Chemistry Portal	malonic-ester-synthesis
RSC ontology ID	RXNO:0000107

The malonic ester synthesis is a chemical reaction where diethyl malonate or another ester of malonic acid is alkylated at the carbon alpha (directly adjacent) to both carbonyl groups, and then converted to a substituted acetic acid.

Reaction formula

A major drawback of malonic ester synthesis is that the alkylation stage can also produce dialkylated structures. This makes separation of products difficult and yields lower.

== Mechanism ==
The carbons alpha to carbonyl groups can be deprotonated by a strong base. The carbanion formed can undergo nucleophilic substitution on the alkyl halide, to give the alkylated compound. On heating, the di-ester undergoes thermal decarboxylation, yielding an acetic acid substituted by the appropriate R group. Thus, the malonic ester can be thought of being equivalent to the ^{−}CH_{2}COOH synthon.

The esters chosen are usually the same as the base used, i.e. ethyl esters with sodium ethoxide. This is to prevent scrambling by transesterification.

== Variations ==
=== Dialkylation ===
The ester may be dialkylated if deprotonation and alkylation are repeated before the addition of aqueous acid.

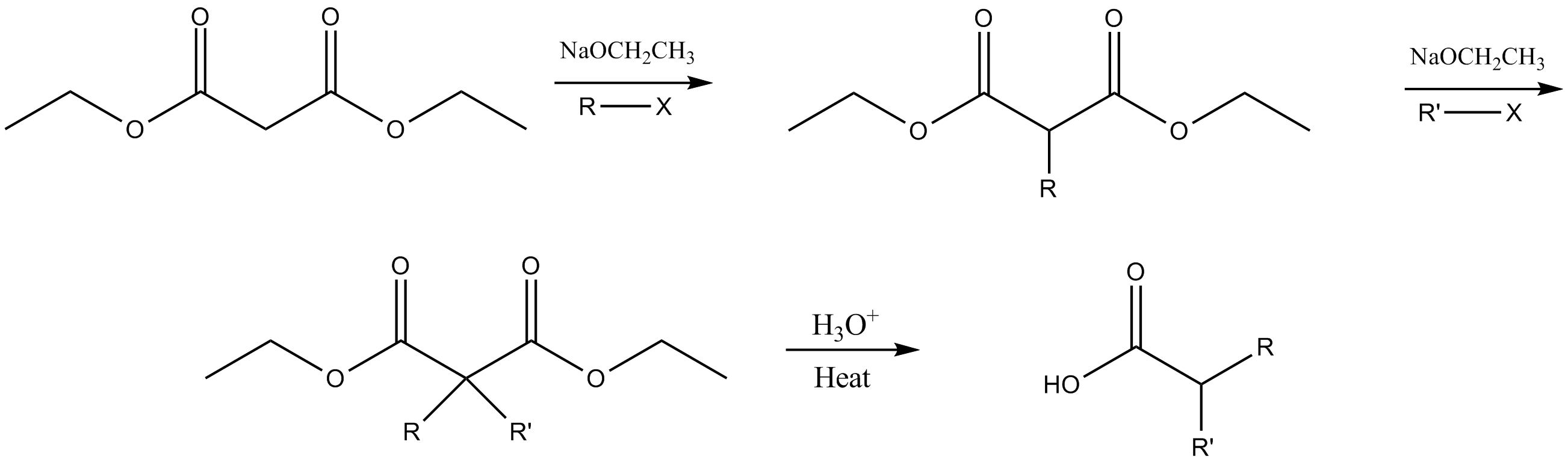

=== Cycloalkylcarboxylic acid synthesis ===
Intramolecular malonic ester synthesis occurs when reacted with a dihalide. This reaction is also called the Perkin alicyclic synthesis (see: alicyclic compound) after investigator William Henry Perkin, Jr.

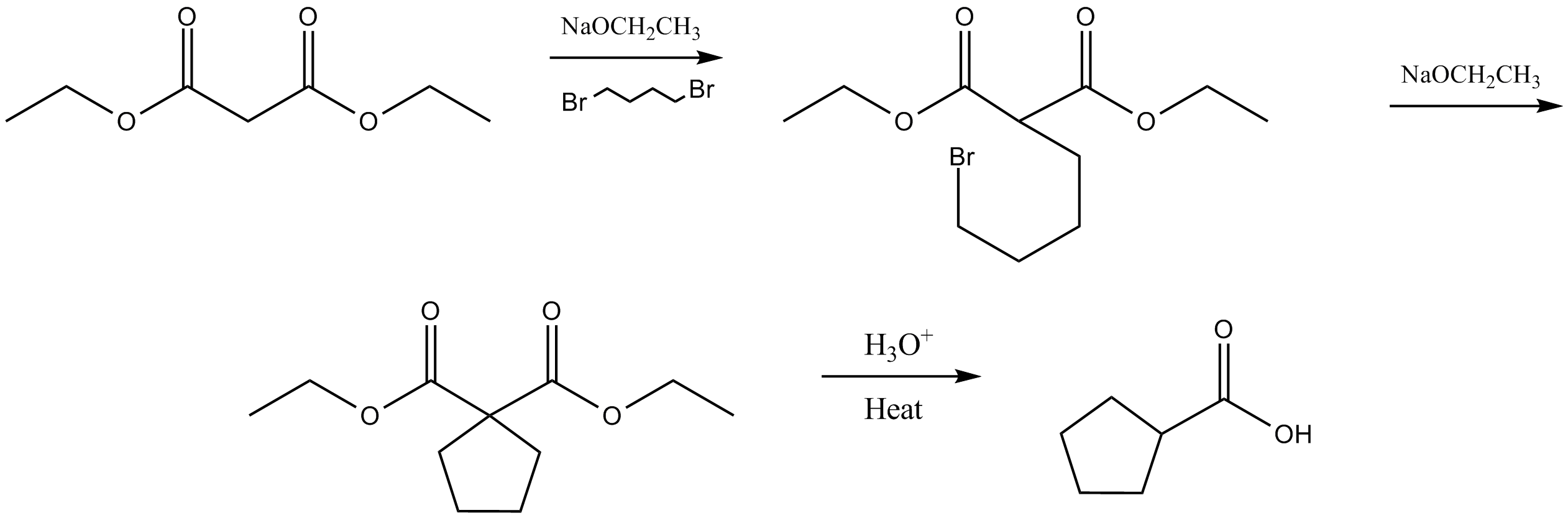

== Application ==
In the production of medicines, malonic ester is used for the synthesis of barbiturates, as well as sedatives and anticonvulsants.

Used in organic synthesis.

== See also ==
- Knoevenagel condensation
- Acetoacetic ester synthesis
