= Holo-(acyl-carrier-protein) synthase =

phosphopantetheinyltransferase
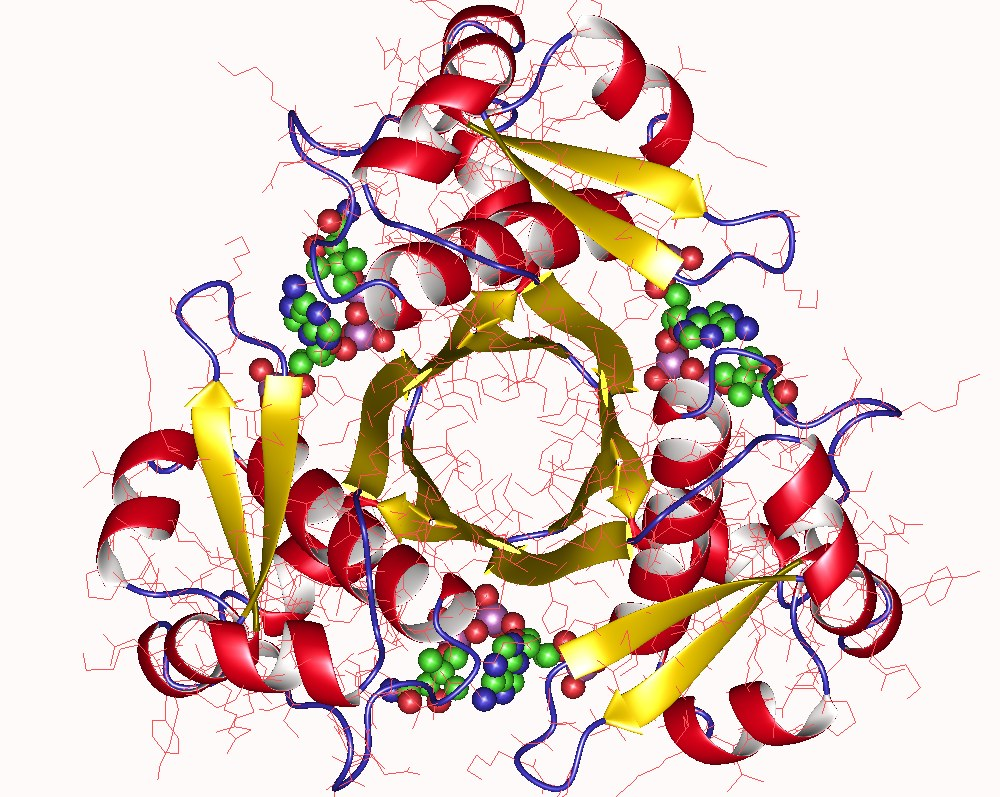
- holo-[acyl-carrier-protein] synthase trimer, Helicobacter pylori

Identifiers
- EC no.: 2.7.8.7
- CAS no.: 37278-30-1

Databases
- BRENDA: enzyme data
- ExPASy: NiceZyme view
- KEGG: enzyme entry
- MetaCyc: metabolic pathway
- Rhea: reactions
- PDB structures: RCSB PDB PDBe PDBsum
- Gene Ontology: AmiGO / QuickGO
Search
- PMC: articles
- PubMed: articles
- NCBI: proteins

ACPS
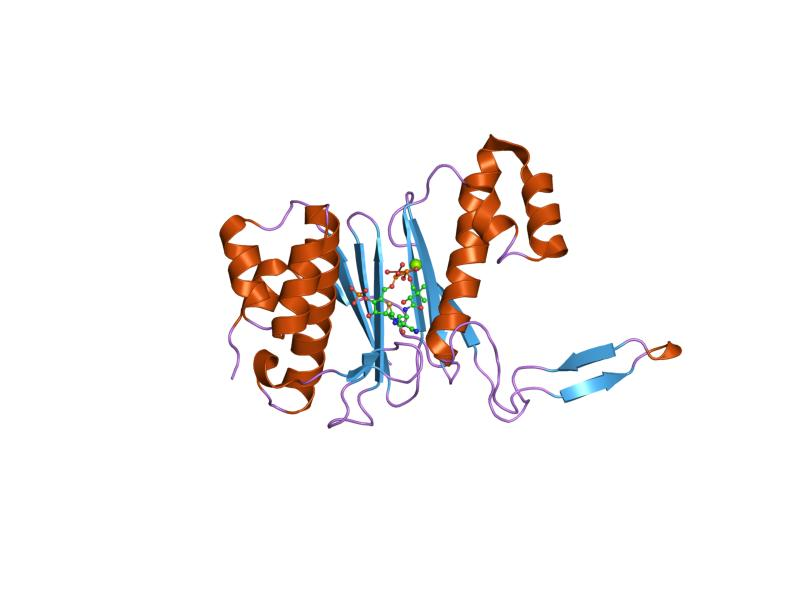
- crystal structure of the 4'-phosphopantetheinyl transferase sfp-coenzyme a complex

Identifiers
- Symbol: ACPS
- Pfam: PF01648
- InterPro: IPR008278
- SCOP2: 1qr0 / SCOPe / SUPFAM
Available protein structures:
- PDB: IPR008278 PF01648 (ECOD; PDBsum)
- AlphaFold: IPR008278; PF01648

In enzymology and molecular biology, a holo-[acyl-carrier-protein] synthase (ACPS, EC 2.7.8.7) is an enzyme that catalyzes the chemical reaction:

CoA-[4'-phosphopantetheine] + apo-acyl carrier protein $\rightleftharpoons$ adenosine 3',5'-bisphosphate + holo-acyl carrier protein

This enzyme belongs to the family of transferases, specifically those transferring non-standard substituted phosphate groups, and more specifically to the 4'-phosphopantetheinyl transferases (PPTases) named after the group they transfer.

In mammals, this activity is performed by the PPTase, aminoadipate-semialdehyde dehydrogenase-phosphopantetheinyl transferase (AASDHPPT), which acts in both the cytosol and mitochondria. It acts on all substrates with an acyl carrier protein domain, which includes not only the "type II" mitochondrial ACP (NDUFAB1), but also the ACP part in "type I" proteins AASDH, ALDH1L1, ALDH1L2, and FASN. It also processes DHRS2, which does not have an ACP domain.

== Function ==
All ACPS enzymes known so far are evolutionally related to each other in a single superfamily of proteins. It transfers a 4'-phosphopantetheine (4'-PP) moiety from coenzyme A (CoA) to an invariant serine in an acyl carrier protein (ACP), a small protein responsible for acyl group activation in fatty acid biosynthesis. This post-translational modification renders holo-ACP capable of acyl group activation via thioesterification of the cysteamine thiol of 4'-PP. This superfamily consists of two subtypes: the trimeric ACPS type such as E. coli ACPS and the monomeric Sfp (PCP-synthesizing) type such as B. subtilis SFP. Structures from both families are now known. The active site accommodates a magnesium ion. The most highly conserved regions of the protein are involved in binding the magnesium ion.

== Nomenclature ==
The systematic name of this enzyme class is CoA-[4'-phosphopantetheine]:apo-[acyl-carrier-protein] 4'-pantetheinephosphotransferase. Other names in common use, disregarding the synthetase/synthase spelling difference, include acyl carrier protein holoprotein synthetase, holo-ACP synthetase, coenzyme A:fatty acid synthetase apoenzyme 4'-phosphopantetheine, acyl carrier protein synthetase (ACPS), PPTase, acyl carrier protein synthase, P-pant transferase, and CoA:apo-[acyl-carrier-protein] pantetheinephosphotransferase.

== Structural studies ==
As of late 2007, 8 structures have been solved for this class of enzymes, with PDB accession codes PDB: 1F7L, PDB: 1F7T, PDB: 1F80, PDB: 1FTE, PDB: 1FTF, PDB: 1FTH, PDB: 2JBZ, and PDB: 2JCA.
