= AASDHPPT =

Protein-coding gene in the species Homo sapiens

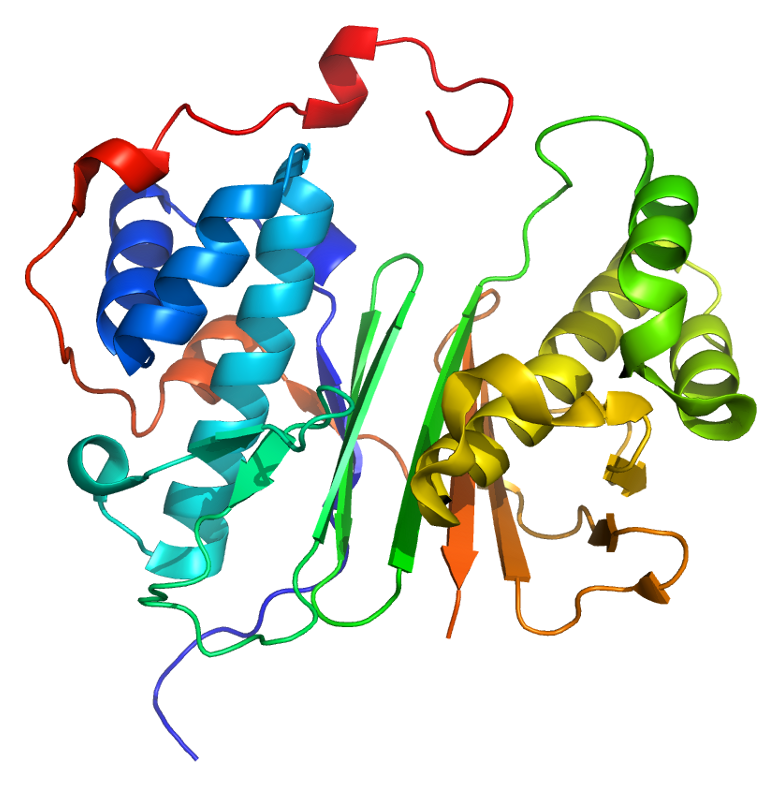

Identifiers
- Aliases: AASDHPPT, AASD-PPT, LYS2, LYS5, CGI-80, ACPS, aminoadipate-semialdehyde dehydrogenase-phosphopantetheinyl transferase
- External IDs: OMIM: 607756; MGI: 1914868; GeneCards: AASDHPPT
Available structures
PDB	Ortholog search: PDBe RCSB
PDB	List of PDB id codes 2BYD, 2C43, 2CG5
Enzyme activity
EC #	BRENDA	ExPASy	KEGG	MetaCyc
2.7.8.7	↗	↗	↗	↗

Gene location (Human)
Chr.	Chromosome 11 (human)
Band	11q22.3	Start	106,075,501 bp
Band	11q22.3	End	106,098,699 bp

Gene location (Mouse)
Chr.	Chromosome 9 (mouse)
Band	9|9 A1	Start	4,294,793 bp
Band	9|9 A1	End	4,309,471 bp
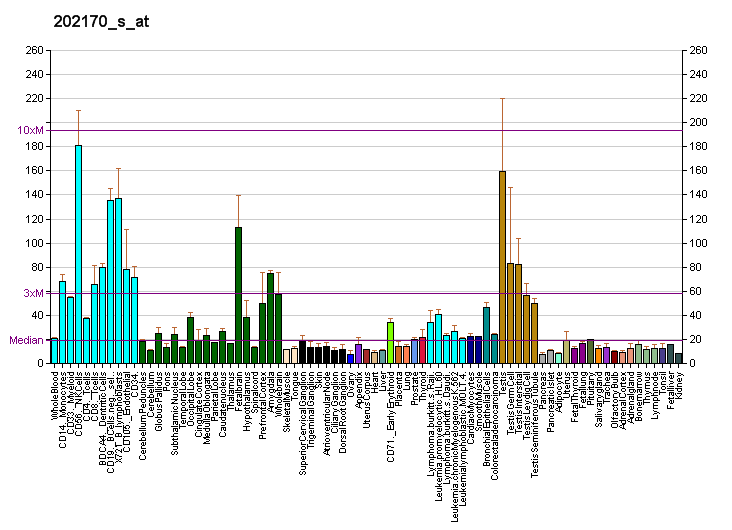
RNA expression pattern
Bgee	Human / Mouse (ortholog); Top expressed in: sperm; Epithelium of choroid plexus; frontal pole; postcentral gyrus; Brodmann area 23; superior frontal gyrus; superior vestibular nucleus; pons; cerebellar vermis; orbitofrontal cortex / Top expressed in: hand; endocardial cushion; atrioventricular valve; Paneth cell; spermatocyte; abdominal wall; left lobe of liver; urothelium; transitional epithelium of urinary bladder; soleus muscle; More reference expression data
BioGPS	More reference expression data
Gene ontology
Molecular function	transferase activity; protein binding; magnesium ion binding; metal ion binding; holo-[acyl-carrier-protein synthase activity]
Cellular component	cytoplasm; cytosol; extracellular exosome
Biological process	lysine biosynthetic process via aminoadipic acid; pantothenate metabolic process
Sources:Amigo / QuickGO
Orthologs
Databases	NCBI: entry; OMA: entry
Species	Human	Mouse
Entrez	60496	67618
Ensembl	ENSG00000149313	ENSMUSG00000025894
UniProt	Q9NRN7	Q9CQF6
RefSeq (mRNA)	NM_015423	NM_026276; NM_001326359
RefSeq (protein)	NP_056238	NP_001313288; NP_080552
Location (UCSC)	Chr 11: 106.08 – 106.1 Mb	Chr 9: 4.29 – 4.31 Mb
PubMed search
- Wikidata
View/Edit Human	View/Edit Mouse

L-aminoadipate-semialdehyde dehydrogenase-phosphopantetheinyl transferase (AASDHPPT) is an enzyme that in humans is encoded by the AASDHPPT gene. It has been suggested that defects in the human gene result in pipecolic acidemia.

The AASDHPPT protein catalyzes the post-translational modification phosphopantetheinylation, in which a 4'-phosphopantetheine (4'-PP) group derived from coenzyme A is covalently attached to target proteins in both cytosol and mitochondria. In the cytosol, these include fatty acid synthase (FASN), aminoadipate semialdehyde dehydrogenase (AASDH), and aldehyde dehydrogenase 1 family member L1 (ALDH1L1), whereas in mitochondria the targets are the mitochondrial acyl carrier protein (mtACP), aldehyde dehydrogenase 1 family member L2 (ALDH1L2), and dehydrogenase/reductase 2 (DHRS2). With the exception of DHRS2, the targets of AASDHPPT contain a acyl carrier protein (ACP) domain, a cofactor domain widespread across bacteria and eukaryotes with roles in the synthesis of fatty acids, polyketides, and nonribosomal peptides.

The protein encoded by this gene is similar to Saccharomyces cerevisiae LYS5, which is required for the activation of the alpha-aminoadipate dehydrogenase in the biosynthetic pathway of lysine. Yeast alpha-aminoadipate dehydrogenase converts alpha-biosynthetic-aminoadipate semialdehyde to alpha-aminoadipate.
