= Fatty-acyl-CoA synthase =

Fatty-Acyl-CoA Synthase
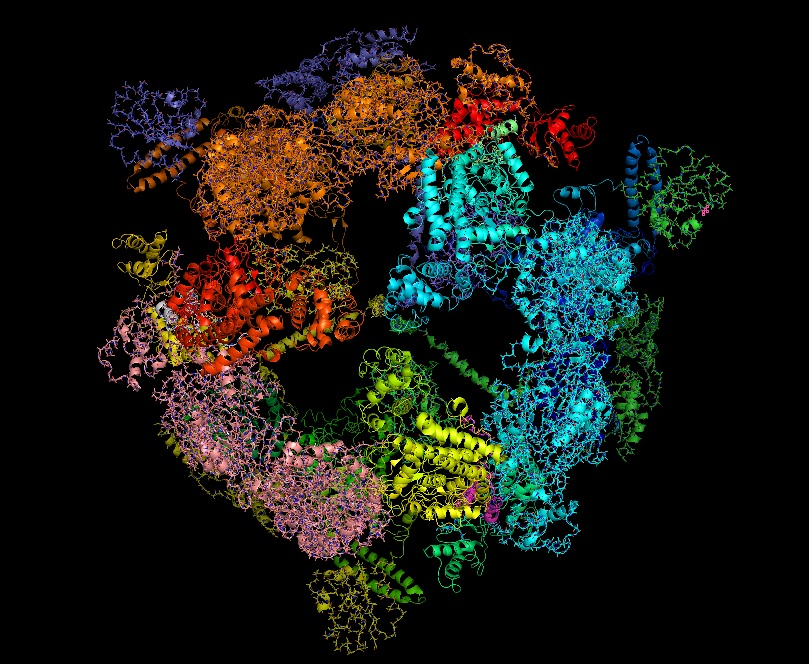
- Ribbon 3D model of Yeast Fatty Acid Synthase.

Identifiers
- EC no.: 2.3.1.86
- CAS no.: 9045-77-6

Databases
- IntEnz: IntEnz view
- BRENDA: BRENDA entry
- ExPASy: NiceZyme view
- KEGG: KEGG entry
- MetaCyc: metabolic pathway
- PRIAM: profile
- PDB structures: RCSB PDB PDBe PDBsum
- Gene Ontology: AmiGO / QuickGO
Search
- PMC: articles
- PubMed: articles
- NCBI: proteins

Fatty-acyl-CoA synthase, or more commonly known as yeast fatty acid synthase (and not to be confused with long chain fatty acyl-CoA synthetase), is an enzyme complex responsible for fatty acid biosynthesis, and is of Type I Fatty Acid Synthesis (FAS). Yeast fatty acid synthase plays a pivotal role in fatty acid synthesis. It is a 2.6 MDa barrel shaped complex and is composed of two, unique multi-functional subunits: alpha and beta. Together, the alpha and beta units are arranged in an α_{6}β_{6}structure. The catalytic activities of this enzyme complex involves a coordination system of enzymatic reactions between the alpha and beta subunits. The enzyme complex therefore consists of six functional centers for fatty acid synthesis.

== Reaction ==
The enzyme catalyzes the reaction:

Acetyl-CoA + n malonyl-CoA + 4n NADPH + 4n H^{+} $\rightleftharpoons$ long-chain-acyl-CoA + n CoA + n CO_{2} + 4n NADP^{+}

The 4 substrates of this enzyme are acetyl-CoA, malonyl-CoA, NADPH, and H^{+}, whereas its 4 products are acyl-CoA, CoA, CO_{2}, and NADP^{+}.

More specifically, the FAS catalysis mechanism consumes an acetyl coenzyme A (acetyl-CoA) and seven malonyl-CoA molecules to produce a palmitoyl-CoA.

== Background ==
Synthesis of fatty acids is generally performed by fatty acid synthase (FAS). Though the syntheses of fatty acids are very similar across all organisms, the enzymes and subsequent enzymatic mechanisms involved in fatty acid synthesis vary between eukaryotes and prokaryotes. There are two types of fatty acid synthesis (FAS) mechanisms: type I FAS and type II FAS. Type I FAS exists in eukaryotes, including mammalian cells and fungi. Type II FAS are found in prokaryotes. The type I FAS system utilizes a multi-enzyme complex, which are highly integrated, while the type II FAS system utilizes individual, separate enzymes to catalyze the reactions involved in fatty acid synthesis. Yeast fatty acyl synthase belongs to the Type I FAS and was the first of Type I FAS to be studied.

== Structure ==
Yeast fatty acyl synthase, of Type I FAS, is composed of a α_{6}β_{6} complex in which an αβ unit forms one functional center for fatty acid synthesis. Yeast fatty acyl synthase therefore has six reaction units for its fatty acid synthesis, in which each of these units function independently from one another. Each α and β subunit, in turn, has four functional domains, and together, the eight functional domains catalyze all the reactions of fatty acid synthesis in yeast, which includes: activation, priming, elongation, and termination. Consequently, yeast FAS is incredibly unique due to its structural complexity, which contains 48 functional centers for one α_{6}β_{6} complex and can efficiently performs 6 fatty acid syntheses separately at one time.

There are seven, total enzymatic reactions in fatty acid synthesis. These reactions include: activation, priming, four reactions in elongation, and termination. Five these reactions are performed in the beta subunit and two reactions are performed in the alpha subunit.

The 3D protein structure of the enzyme can be found here:PDB. The crystal structure of yeast fatty acid synthase has also been derived, showing both alpha and beta subunits.

== Mechanism ==
Overview of the synthase cycle: (1) Activation (apo→holo) of the FAS by ACPS, (2) priming with Acetyl-CoA by AT, (3) transfer of the acetyl group from the ACP to the active site of the KS, (4) transacylation of the ACP with Maloyl-CoA by MPT, Claisen condensation at the KS by (5) decarboxylation and (6) nucleophilic attack of the enolate at the carbonyl carbon of the acyl group, (7) Reduction of the keto group to a alcohol functionality with NADH by KR, (8) Dehydration of the alcohol to an α,β-unsaturated acyl group by DH, (9) Reduction of the α,β-unsaturated carbonyl group to a saturated acyl group and finally (10) transfer of the acyl group from the ACP to the active site of the KS by which the cycle continues. (11) Termination occurs by transfer of the fatty acid acyl group to CoA by MPT.

=== Activation ===
The activation of yeast FAS occurs in the alpha subunit. The reaction is performed by the holo-(acyl-carrier-protein) synthase (ACPS) domain. ACPS attaches the 4′-phosphopantetheine prosthetic group of CoA to the acyl carrier protein (ACP) domain, which is found in the N terminus of the α subunit. ACP is the only “mobile” domain of the enzyme complex, in which it moves intermediate substrates along all of the catalytic centers the enzyme, most notably the alpha and beta subunits.

=== Priming ===
The next step is priming, or the initiation of fatty acid synthesis. Priming is performed in the β subunit, and is catalyzed by the acetyltransferase (AT, equivalent to bacterial (acyl-carrier-protein) S-acetyltransferase) domain, which initiates the process of fatty acid synthesis. Here, acetyltransferase transfers the acetate group from acetyl-CoA onto the SH group of the 4′-phosphopantetheine prosthetic group of ACP, which had been attached during activation.

=== Elongation ===
Elongation involves four main reactions:

1. The acetyl unit on ACP is condensed with malonyl-ACP to form β-ketobutyryl-ACP
2. Ketobutyryl-ACP is then reduced by ketoacyl-ACP reductase to afford β-hydroxyacyl-ACP
3. β-hydroxyacyl-ACP is then dehydrated to produce enoyl-ACP
4. Enoyl-ACP is then reduced by enoyl-ACP reductase (ER) to form a saturated acyl-ACP, which can be elongated again in a new cycle of elongation

Elongation itself occurs in mainly in the α subunit, though the entire process required for elongation is a coordinated system which involves the α and β subunits. ACP first delivers the acetate group, which had been attached during priming, to the ketoacyl synthase (KS) domain in the α subunit. ACP then moves back to the β subunit to the malonyl/palmitoyl-transacylase (MPT, equivalent to bacterial malonyl transacylase) domain and binds to a malonyl of malonyl-CoA, which will be used for elongation. The newly bound malonyl-ACP then swings back to the KS domain and transfers the malonate group for chain elongation. Now in the KS domain, the bound acyl group is condensed with the malonate to form 3-ketoacyl intermediate: β-ketobutyryl-ACP, releasing carbon dioxide in the process.

In the α subunit is also the ketoacyl reductase (KR) domain. The KR domain is NADPH dependent, and catalyzes substrate reduction, in which ketobutyryl-ACP is reduced to β-hydroxyacyl-ACP by NADPH.

The β-hydroxyacyl-ACP is then transferred back to the β subunit, where it is dehydrated in 3-Hydroxyacyl ACP dehydrase (DH) domain. Another reduction reaction then performed in the enoyl reductase (ER) domain of the β subunit to form a saturated acyl-ACP chain. Finally, ACP brings the substrate back to the KS domain of the α subunit for another cycle of elongation. The elongation cycle is often repeated 3 more times before termination.

Notice the unique characteristic of ACP, which is vital to fatty acid synthesis in its role of shuttling the reaction intermediates between the α and β subunits’ catalytic domains.

=== Termination ===
Once the fatty acid chain reaches 16 or 18 carbons long after cycles of elongation, termination occurs. In the final round of elongation, rather than being taken back to the KS domain, the fatty acid product, which is still bound to ACP, is taken from the ER domain to the MPT domain. Here, CoA is attached to the fatty acid, and the resulting long chain fatty acyl-CoA is released into the cytosol.

== Applications ==
Fatty acids are key components of a cell, therefore, the regulation or inhibition of fatty acid synthesis hold severe consequences for cellular function. The malfunction of the fatty acid synthesis pathway can result in cancer and obesity. However, the significance of fatty acid synthesis also make the fatty acid synthesis pathway a potential target for the search and study of anticancer and antibiotic drugs. It has been found that in humans, fatty acid synthase, is overly expressed in cancer cells. Therefore, FAS, which has been associated only with energy production prior, is now associated with aggressive tumor growth and survival. Studies have also found that human fatty acid synthase is overly expressed in prostate cancer cells.
