= USF =

USF may refer to:

== Organizations ==
=== Education ===
- University of Saint Francis (Indiana), Fort Wayne, Indiana, US
- University of San Francisco, San Francisco, California, US
  - San Francisco Dons (or USF Dons), this university's athletic program
- University of South Florida, Tampa, Florida, US
  - South Florida Bulls (or USF Bulls), this university's athletic program
- University of St. Francis, Joliet, Illinois, US
- University of Sioux Falls, South Dakota, US

=== Other organizations ===
- Ukrainian Startup Fund, a Ukrainian government body that supports tech startups
- Ukrainian Shooting Federation, national governing body for shooting sports in Ukraine
- Universal Service Fund, a United States government program
- Universal Studios Florida, a theme park in Orlando, Florida, US
- Unmanned Systems Forces (disambiguation)
- USAfrica Airways, defunct airline headquartered in Reston, Virginia, US

== Science and technology ==
- Universal Subtitle Format, an XML file format
- Nintendo Ultra 64 Sound Format, a music file format
- Upstream stimulatory factor, DNA-binding proteins regulating gene expression, see USF1 and USF2

== See also ==
- USFS (disambiguation)
