= Yeast fatty acid synthase =

Yeast fatty acid synthase may refer to:

- Fatty acid synthase
- Fatty-acyl-CoA synthase
