= Acyl-(acyl-carrier-protein)—UDP-N-acetylglucosamine O-acyltransferase =

Enzyme

acyl-[acyl-carrier-protein]-UDP-N-acetylglucosamine O-acyltransferase

Identifiers
- EC no.: 2.3.1.129
- CAS no.: 105843-69-4

Databases
- IntEnz: IntEnz view
- BRENDA: BRENDA entry
- ExPASy: NiceZyme view
- KEGG: KEGG entry
- MetaCyc: metabolic pathway
- PRIAM: profile
- PDB structures: RCSB PDB PDBe PDBsum
- Gene Ontology: AmiGO / QuickGO
Search
- PMC: articles
- PubMed: articles
- NCBI: proteins

In enzymology, an acyl-[acyl-carrier-protein]-UDP-N-acetylglucosamine O-acyltransferase (EC 2.3.1.129) is an enzyme that catalyzes the chemical reaction

(R)-3-hydroxytetradecanoyl-[acyl-carrier-protein] + UDP-N-acetylglucosamine $\rightleftharpoons$ [acyl-carrier-protein] + UDP-3-O-(3-hydroxytetradecanoyl)-N-acetylglucosamine

Thus, the two substrates of this enzyme are (R)-3-hydroxytetradecanoyl-acyl-carrier-protein and UDP-N-acetylglucosamine, whereas its two products are acyl-carrier-protein and UDP-3-O-(3-hydroxytetradecanoyl)-N-acetylglucosamine.

This enzyme belongs to the family of transferases, specifically those acyltransferases transferring groups other than aminoacyl groups. The systematic name of this enzyme class is (R)-3-hydroxytetradecanoyl-[acyl-carrier-protein]:UDP-N-acetylglucosamine 3-O-(3-hydroxytetradecanoyl) transferase. Other names in common use include UDP-N-acetylglucosamine acyltransferase and uridine diphosphoacetylglucosamine acyltransferase. This enzyme participates in lipopolysaccharide biosynthesis.

== Structural studies ==
As of late 2007, 7 structures have been solved for this class of enzymes, with PDB accession codes 1J2Z, 1LXA, 2AQ9, 2JF2, 2JF3, 2QIA, and 2QIV.
