= Deacetyl-(citrate-(pro-3S)-lyase) S-acetyltransferase =

deacetyl-[citrate-(pro-3S)-lyase] S-acetyltransferase

Identifiers
- EC no.: 2.3.1.49
- CAS no.: 42616-18-2

Databases
- IntEnz: IntEnz view
- BRENDA: BRENDA entry
- ExPASy: NiceZyme view
- KEGG: KEGG entry
- MetaCyc: metabolic pathway
- PRIAM: profile
- PDB structures: RCSB PDB PDBe PDBsum
- Gene Ontology: AmiGO / QuickGO
Search
- PMC: articles
- PubMed: articles
- NCBI: proteins

In enzymology, a deacetyl-[citrate-(pro-3S)-lyase] S-acetyltransferase (EC 2.3.1.49) is an enzyme that catalyzes the chemical reaction

S-acetylphosphopantetheine + deacetyl-[citrate-oxaloacetate-lyase((pro-3S)-CH_{2}COO-->acetate)] $\rightleftharpoons$ phosphopantetheine + [citrate-oxaloacetate-lyase((pro-3S)-CH_{2}COO-->acetate)]

Thus, the two substrates of this enzyme are S-acetylphosphopantetheine and [[deacetyl-[citrate-oxaloacetate-lyase((pro-3S)-CH2COO-->acetate)]]], whereas its two products are phosphopantetheine and [[citrate-oxaloacetate-lyase((pro-3S)-CH2COO-->acetate)]].

This enzyme belongs to the family of transferases, specifically those acyltransferases transferring groups other than aminoacyl groups. The systematic name of this enzyme class is S-acetylphosphopantetheine:deacetyl-[citrate-oxaloacetate-lyase((pro -3S)-CH2COO-->acetate)] S-acetyltransferase. Other names in common use include S-acetyl phosphopantetheine:deacetyl citrate lyase, S-acetyltransferase, and deacetyl-[citrate-(pro-3S)-lyase] acetyltransferase.
