= Acyl-(acyl-carrier-protein)—phospholipid O-acyltransferase =

Class of enzymes

acyl-[acyl-carrier-protein]-phospholipid O-acyltransferase

Identifiers
- EC no.: 2.3.1.40
- CAS no.: 37257-18-4

Databases
- IntEnz: IntEnz view
- BRENDA: BRENDA entry
- ExPASy: NiceZyme view
- KEGG: KEGG entry
- MetaCyc: metabolic pathway
- PRIAM: profile
- PDB structures: RCSB PDB PDBe PDBsum
- Gene Ontology: AmiGO / QuickGO
Search
- PMC: articles
- PubMed: articles
- NCBI: proteins

In enzymology, an acyl-[acyl-carrier-protein]-phospholipid O-acyltransferase (EC 2.3.1.40) is an enzyme that catalyzes the chemical reaction

acyl-[acyl-carrier protein] + O-(2-acyl-sn-glycero-3-phospho)ethanolamine $\rightleftharpoons$ [acyl-carrier protein] + O-(1,2-diacyl-sn-glycero-3-phospho)ethanolamine

Thus, the two substrates of this enzyme are acyl-acyl-carrier protein and O-(2-acyl-sn-glycero-3-phospho)ethanolamine, whereas its two products are acyl-carrier protein and O-(1,2-diacyl-sn-glycero-3-phospho)ethanolamine.

This enzyme belongs to the family of transferases, specifically those acyltransferases transferring groups other than aminoacyl groups. The systematic name of this enzyme class is acyl-[acyl-carrier protein]:O-(2-acyl-sn-glycero-3-phospho)ethanolamine O-acyltransferase. Other names in common use include acyl-[acyl-carrier, protein]:O-(2-acyl-sn-glycero-3-phospho)-ethanolamine, and O-acyltransferase. This enzyme participates in glycerophospholipid metabolism.
