= Galactosylacylglycerol O-acyltransferase =

galactosylacylglycerol O-acyltransferase

Identifiers
- EC no.: 2.3.1.141
- CAS no.: 119129-68-9

Databases
- IntEnz: IntEnz view
- BRENDA: BRENDA entry
- ExPASy: NiceZyme view
- KEGG: KEGG entry
- MetaCyc: metabolic pathway
- PRIAM: profile
- PDB structures: RCSB PDB PDBe PDBsum
- Gene Ontology: AmiGO / QuickGO
Search
- PMC: articles
- PubMed: articles
- NCBI: proteins

In enzymology, a galactosylacylglycerol O-acyltransferase (EC 2.3.1.141) is an enzyme that catalyzes the chemical reaction

acyl-[acyl-carrier-protein] + sn-3-D-galactosyl-sn-2-acylglycerol $\rightleftharpoons$ [acyl-carrier-protein] + D-galactosyldiacylglycerol

Thus, the two substrates of this enzyme are [[acyl-[acyl-carrier-protein]]] and sn-3-D-galactosyl-sn-2-acylglycerol, whereas its two products are acyl-carrier-protein and D-galactosyldiacylglycerol.

This enzyme belongs to the family of transferases, specifically those acyltransferases transferring groups other than aminoacyl groups. The systematic name of this enzyme class is acyl-[acyl-carrier-protein]:D-galactosylacylglycerol O-acyltransferase. Other names in common use include acyl-acyl-carrier protein: lysomonogalactosyldiacylglycerol, acyltransferase, and acyl-ACP:lyso-MGDG acyltransferase. This enzyme participates in glycerolipid metabolism.
