= Enoyl-acyl carrier protein reductase =

InterPro Family

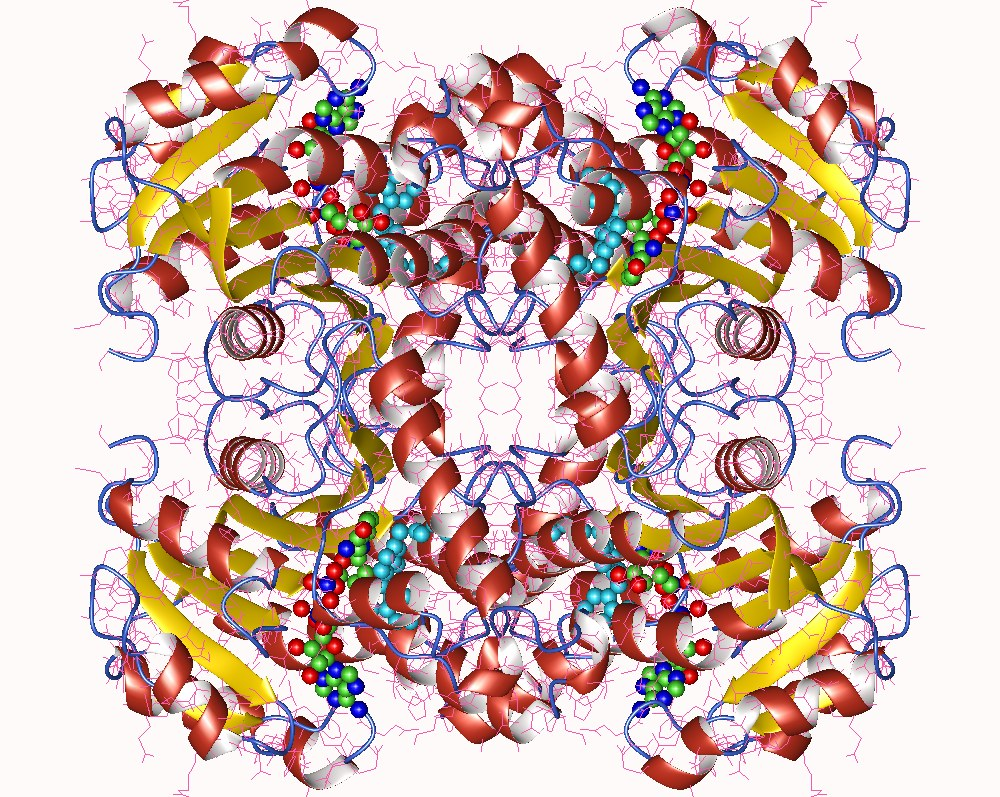
- Enoyl-[acyl-carrier-protein] reductase [NADH] tetramer, Mycobacterium tuberculosis

Identifiers
- EC no.: 1.3.1.9
- CAS no.: 37251-08-4

Databases
- IntEnz: IntEnz view
- BRENDA: BRENDA entry
- ExPASy: NiceZyme view
- KEGG: KEGG entry
- MetaCyc: metabolic pathway
- PRIAM: profile
- PDB structures: RCSB PDB PDBe PDBsum
- Gene Ontology: AmiGO / QuickGO
Search
- PMC: articles
- PubMed: articles
- NCBI: proteins

Enoyl-acyl carrier protein reductase (ENR or FabI) (EC 1.3.1.9), is a key enzyme of the type II fatty acid synthesis (FAS) system. ENR is an attractive target for narrow-spectrum antibacterial drug discovery because of its essential role in metabolism and its sequence conservation across many bacterial species. In addition, the bacterial ENR sequence and structural organization are distinctly different from those of mammalian fatty acid biosynthesis enzymes.

At lower concentrations, Triclosan and Triclocarban provide a bacteriostatic effect by binding to ENR. Atromentin and leucomelone possess antibacterial activity, inhibiting the enzyme in the bacteria Streptococcus pneumoniae.

== See also ==
- Enoyl-(acyl-carrier-protein) reductase (NADPH, A-specific)
- Enoyl-(acyl-carrier-protein) reductase (NADPH, B-specific)
- Cis-2-enoyl-CoA reductase (NADPH)
