= Phosphopantetheine =

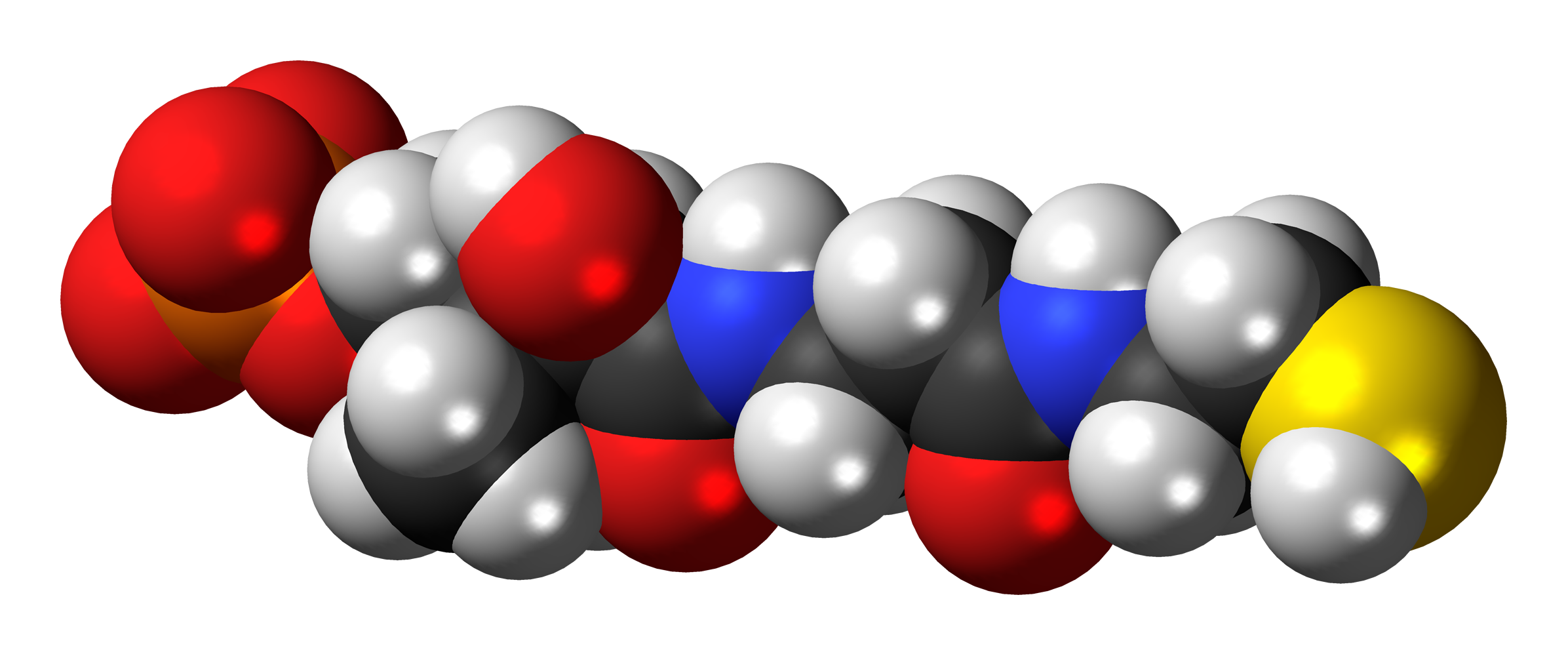

Identifiers
CAS Number	2226-71-3
3D model (JSmol)	Interactive image
ChEBI	CHEBI:4222
ChemSpider	103123
DrugBank	DB03912
KEGG	C00831
MeSH	phosphopantetheine
PubChem CID	115254
UNII	NM39WU8OFM
CompTox Dashboard (EPA)	DTXSID30897420
- InChI: InChI=1S/C11H23N2O7PS/c1-11(2,7-20-21(17,18)19)9(15)10(16)13-4-3-8(14)12-5-6-22/h9,15,22H,3-7H2,1-2H3,(H,12,14)(H,13,16)(H2,17,18,19)/t9-/m0/s1 Key: JDMUPRLRUUMCTL-VIFPVBQESA-N
- SMILES: O=C(NCCS)CCNC(=O)[C@H](O)C(C)(C)COP(=O)(O)O

Properties
Chemical formula	C_{11}H_{23}N_{2}O_{7}PS
Molar mass	358.349 g/mol
- Except where otherwise noted, data are given for materials in their standard state (at 25 °C [77 °F], 100 kPa). Infobox references

Phosphopantetheine, also known as 4'-phosphopantetheine (4'-PP), is a prosthetic group of several acyl carrier proteins including the acyl carrier proteins (ACP) of fatty acid synthases, ACPs of polyketide synthases, the peptidyl carrier proteins (PCP), as well as aryl carrier proteins (ArCP) of nonribosomal peptide synthetases (NRPS). It is also present in formyltetrahydrofolate dehydrogenase.

Subsequent to the expression of the apo acyl carrier protein, 4'-phosphopantetheine moiety is attached to a serine residue. The coupling involves formation of a phosphodiester linkage. This coupling is mediated by acyl carrier protein synthase (ACPS), a 4'-phosphopantetheinyl transferase.

Phosphopantetheine prosthetic group covalently links to the acyl group via a high energy thioester bond. The flexibility and length of the phosphopantetheine chain (approximately 2 nm) allows the covalently tethered intermediates to access spatially distinct enzyme-active sites. This accessibility increases the effective molarity of the intermediate and allows an assembly line-like process.

Phosphopantetheinylation is catalyzed in mammals by a single phosphopantetheinyl transferase (PPTase), AASDHPPT, which is present in both the cytosol and mitochondria, whereas plants and yeast possess a separate mitochondrial PPTase in addition to the cytosolic enzyme.

In mammals, six proteins are known to carry a serine residue modified by 4'-phosphopantetheine:

- cytosolic
  - fatty acid synthase (FASN)
  - aminoadipate semialdehyde dehydrogenase (AASDH)
  - aldehyde dehydrogenase 1 family member L1 (ALDH1L1)
- mitochondrial
  - mitochondrial acyl carrier protein (mtACP)
  - aldehyde dehydrogenase 1 family member L2 (ALDH1L2)
  - dehydrogenase/reductase 2 (DHRS2)

== See also ==
- Fatty acid synthase
- Pantothenic acid
