= Enoyl-(acyl-carrier-protein) reductase (NADPH, B-specific) =

Class of enzymes

enoyl-[acyl-carrier-protein] reductase (NADPH, B-specific)

Identifiers
- EC no.: 1.3.1.10
- CAS no.: 37251-09-5

Databases
- IntEnz: IntEnz view
- BRENDA: BRENDA entry
- ExPASy: NiceZyme view
- KEGG: KEGG entry
- MetaCyc: metabolic pathway
- PRIAM: profile
- PDB structures: RCSB PDB PDBe PDBsum
- Gene Ontology: AmiGO / QuickGO
Search
- PMC: articles
- PubMed: articles
- NCBI: proteins

In enzymology, enoyl-[acyl-carrier-protein] reductase (NADPH, B-specific) (EC 1.3.1.10) is an enzyme that catalyzes the chemical reaction

The enzyme converts the trans double bond of a thioester attached to an acyl carrier protein to the corresponding saturated compound using nicotinamide adenine dinucleotide phosphate (NADPH) and a proton as reducing agent.

This enzyme belongs to the family of oxidoreductases, to be specific, those acting on the CH-CH group of donor with NAD+ or NADP+ as acceptor. The systematic name of this enzyme class is acyl-[acyl-carrier-protein]:NADP+ oxidoreductase (B-specific). Other names in common use include acyl-ACP dehydrogenase, reductase, enoyl-[acyl carrier protein] (reduced nicotinamide, adenine dinucleotide phosphate), NADPH 2-enoyl Co A reductase, enoyl acyl-carrier-protein reductase, enoyl-ACP reductase, and enoyl-[acyl-carrier-protein] reductase (NADPH, B-specific). This enzyme participates in fatty acid biosynthesis.

== Structural studies ==
As of late 2007, two structures have been solved for this class of enzymes, with PDB accession codes 1ULU and 2YW9.
