= USFS (disambiguation) =

USFS often refers to the United States Forest Service, an agency of the federal government of the United States.

USFS may also refer to:

- United States Foreign Service, a personnel system within the federal government of the United States
- U.S. Figure Skating, the national governing body for the sport of figure skating in the United States
- U.S. Financial Services, a division of the Dutch financial corporation ING Group
- U.S. Franchise Systems, a defunct American franchise company

== See also ==
- USF (disambiguation)
