= (acyl-carrier-protein) S-acetyltransferase =

Class of enzymes

[acyl-carrier-protein] S-acetyltransferase

Identifiers
- EC no.: 2.3.1.38
- CAS no.: 37257-16-2

Databases
- IntEnz: IntEnz view
- BRENDA: BRENDA entry
- ExPASy: NiceZyme view
- KEGG: KEGG entry
- MetaCyc: metabolic pathway
- PRIAM: profile
- PDB structures: RCSB PDB PDBe PDBsum
- Gene Ontology: AmiGO / QuickGO
Search
- PMC: articles
- PubMed: articles
- NCBI: proteins

In enzymology, a [acyl-carrier-protein] S-acetyltransferase (EC 2.3.1.38) is an enzyme that catalyzes the reversible chemical reaction

acetyl-CoA + [acyl-carrier-protein] $\rightleftharpoons$ CoA + acetyl-[acyl-carrier-protein]

Thus, the two substrates of this enzyme are acetyl-CoA and acyl carrier protein, whereas its two products are CoA and acetyl-acyl-carrier-protein.

This enzyme belongs to the family of transferases, specifically those acyltransferases transferring groups other than aminoacyl groups. The systematic name of this enzyme class is acetyl-CoA:[acyl-carrier-protein] S-acetyltransferase. Other names in common use include acetyl coenzyme A-acyl-carrier-protein transacylase, acetyl-CoA:ACP transacylase, [acyl-carrier-protein]acetyltransferase, [ACP]acetyltransferase, and ACAT. This enzyme participates in fatty acid biosynthesis.

== Structural studies ==
As of late 2007, only one structure has been solved for this class of enzymes, with the PDB accession code 2PFF.
