= PPRC1 =

Protein-coding gene in the species Homo sapiens

Identifiers
- Aliases: PPRC1, PRC, peroxisome proliferator-activated receptor gamma, coactivator-related 1, PPARG related coactivator 1
- External IDs: OMIM: 617462; MGI: 2385096; GeneCards: PPRC1

Gene location (Human)
Chr.	Chromosome 10 (human)
Band	10q24.32	Start	102,132,994 bp
Band	10q24.32	End	102,150,333 bp

Gene location (Mouse)
Chr.	Chromosome 19 (mouse)
Band	19|19 C3	Start	46,033,325 bp
Band	19|19 C3	End	46,061,354 bp
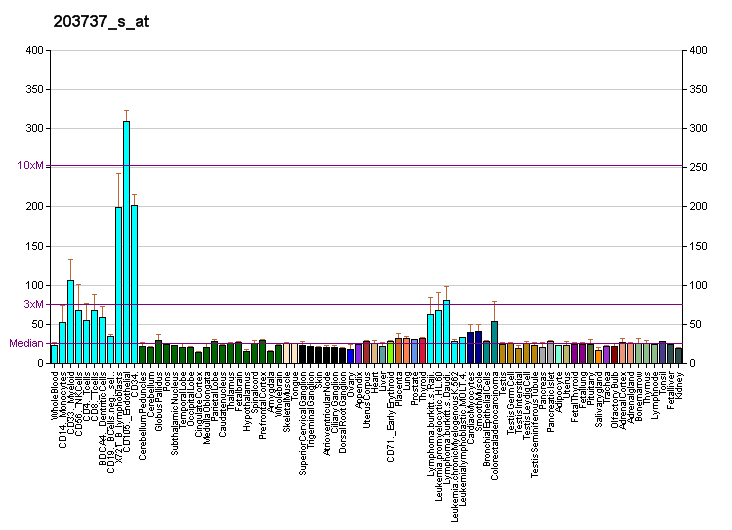
RNA expression pattern
Bgee	Human / Mouse (ortholog); Top expressed in: left uterine tube; oocyte; skin of abdomen; upper lobe of left lung; left ovary; right ovary; anterior pituitary; secondary oocyte; skin of leg; gonad / Top expressed in: otic placode; epiblast; otic vesicle; tail of embryo; saccule; primitive streak; Gonadal ridge; human fetus; morula; morula; More reference expression data
BioGPS	More reference expression data
Gene ontology
Molecular function	nuclear receptor coactivator activity; nucleic acid binding; transcription coregulator activity; RNA binding; transcription factor binding
Cellular component	nucleus; nucleoplasm
Biological process	positive regulation of DNA-binding transcription factor activity; mitochondrion organization; positive regulation of transcription by RNA polymerase II; transcription, DNA-templated; regulation of transcription, DNA-templated
Sources:Amigo / QuickGO
Orthologs
Databases	NCBI: entry; OMA: entry
Species	Human	Mouse
Entrez	23082	226169
Ensembl	ENSG00000148840	ENSMUSG00000055491
UniProt	Q5VV67	Q6NZN1
RefSeq (mRNA)	NM_001288727; NM_001288728; NM_015062	NM_001081214; NM_145504; NM_001346801
RefSeq (protein)	NP_001275656; NP_001275657; NP_055877	NP_001074683; NP_001333730
Location (UCSC)	Chr 10: 102.13 – 102.15 Mb	Chr 19: 46.03 – 46.06 Mb
PubMed search
- Wikidata
View/Edit Human	View/Edit Mouse

Peroxisome proliferator-activated receptor gamma coactivator-related protein 1 is a protein that in humans is encoded by the PPRC1 gene.

The protein encoded by this gene is similar to PPAR-gamma coactivator 1 (PPARGC1/PGC-1), a protein that can activate mitochondrial biogenesis in part through a direct interaction with nuclear respiratory factor 1 (NRF1). This protein has been shown to interact with NRF1. It is thought to be a functional relative of PPARGC1 that activates mitochondrial biogenesis through NRF1 in response to proliferative signals.

== Interactions ==
PPRC1 has been shown to interact with USF2.
