= Unmanned Systems Forces =

Unmanned Systems Forces or Pilotless Systems Forces may refer to:

- Unmanned Systems Forces of Russia (Войска беспилотных систем [ВБС], Voyska bespilotnykh sistem [VBS], '"Pilotless Systems Troops"')
- Unmanned Systems Forces of Ukraine (Сили безпілотних систем, СБС, Syly bezpilotnykh system, SBS, '"Pilotless Systems Forces"')

== See also ==
- Russo-Ukrainian war (2022–present) order of battle
  - Center for Advanced Unmanned Technologies "Rubicon"
- Unmanned aerial vehicle
  - Unmanned combat aerial vehicle
  - Unmanned aerial vehicles in the United States military
- Unmanned ground vehicle
- Unmanned surface vehicle
