= Enoyl-(acyl-carrier-protein) reductase (NADPH, A-specific) =

Enzyme class

enoyl-[acyl-carrier-protein] reductase (NADPH, A-specific)

Identifiers
- EC no.: 1.3.1.39

Databases
- IntEnz: IntEnz view
- BRENDA: BRENDA entry
- ExPASy: NiceZyme view
- KEGG: KEGG entry
- MetaCyc: metabolic pathway
- PRIAM: profile
- PDB structures: RCSB PDB PDBe PDBsum
- Gene Ontology: AmiGO / QuickGO
Search
- PMC: articles
- PubMed: articles
- NCBI: proteins

In enzymology, an enoyl-[acyl-carrier-protein] reductase (NADPH, A-specific) (EC 1.3.1.39) is an enzyme that catalyzes the chemical reaction

acyl-[acyl-carrier-protein] + NADP^{+} $\rightleftharpoons$ trans-2,3-dehydroacyl-[acyl-carrier-protein] + NADPH + H^{+}

Thus, the two substrates of this enzyme are [[acyl-[acyl-carrier-protein]]] and NADP^{+}, whereas its 3 products are [[trans-2,3-dehydroacyl-[acyl-carrier-protein]]], NADPH, and H^{+}.

This enzyme belongs to the family of oxidoreductases, to be specific, those acting on the CH-CH group of donor with NAD+ or NADP+ as acceptor. The systematic name of this enzyme class is acyl-[acyl-carrier-protein]:NADP+ oxidoreductase (A-specific). Other names in common use include acyl-ACP dehydrogenase, enoyl-[acyl carrier protein] (reduced nicotinamide adenine, dinucleotide phosphate) reductase, NADPH 2-enoyl Co A reductase, enoyl-ACp reductase, and enoyl-[acyl-carrier-protein] reductase (NADPH2, A-specific).
