= Cis-2-enoyl-CoA reductase (NADPH) =

Class of enzymes

cis-2-enoyl-CoA reductase (NADPH)

Identifiers
- EC no.: 1.3.1.37
- CAS no.: 72841-00-0

Databases
- IntEnz: IntEnz view
- BRENDA: BRENDA entry
- ExPASy: NiceZyme view
- KEGG: KEGG entry
- MetaCyc: metabolic pathway
- PRIAM: profile
- PDB structures: RCSB PDB PDBe PDBsum
- Gene Ontology: AmiGO / QuickGO
Search
- PMC: articles
- PubMed: articles
- NCBI: proteins

In enzymology, a cis-2-enoyl-CoA reductase (NADPH) (EC 1.3.1.37) is an enzyme that catalyzes the chemical reaction

acyl-CoA + NADP^{+} $\rightleftharpoons$ cis-2,3-dehydroacyl-CoA + NADPH + H^{+}

Thus, the two substrates of this enzyme are acyl-CoA and NADP^{+}, whereas its 3 products are cis-2,3-dehydroacyl-CoA, NADPH, and H^{+}.

== Nomenclature ==
This enzyme belongs to the family of oxidoreductases, specifically those acting on the CH-CH group of donor with NAD+ or NADP+ as acceptor. The systematic name of this enzyme class is acyl-CoA:NADP+ cis-2-oxidoreductase. Other names in common use include NADPH-dependent cis-enoyl-CoA reductase, reductase, cis-2-enoyl coenzyme A, cis-2-enoyl-coenzyme A reductase, and cis-2-enoyl-CoA reductase (NADPH).
