= AP-1 binding site =

The AP-1 binding site, also known as the AP-1 promoter site, is a DNA sequence to which AP-1 transcription factors are able to bind. The AP-1 binding site, in humans, has a nucleotide sequence of ATGAGTCAT, where A corresponds to adenine, T corresponds to thymine, G corresponds to guanine, and C corresponds to cytosine.
