= Fatty acid synthase =

Class of enzymes

FASN
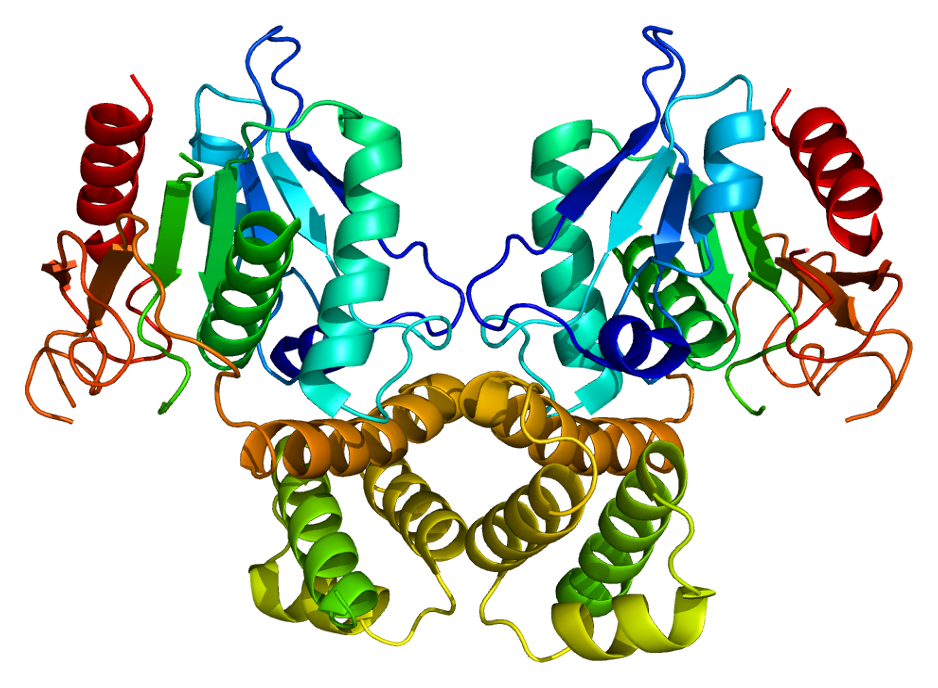

Identifiers
- Aliases: FASN, fatty acid synthase, Fasn, A630082H08Rik, FAS, OA-519, SDR27X1, Fatty acid synthase
- External IDs: OMIM: 600212; MGI: 95485; GeneCards: FASN

Gene location (Human)
Chr.	Chromosome 17 (human)
Band	17q25.3	Start	82,078,338 bp
Band	17q25.3	End	82,098,294 bp

Gene location (Mouse)
Chr.	Chromosome 11 (mouse)
Band	11 E2|11 84.56 cM	Start	120,696,672 bp
Band	11 E2|11 84.56 cM	End	120,715,373 bp
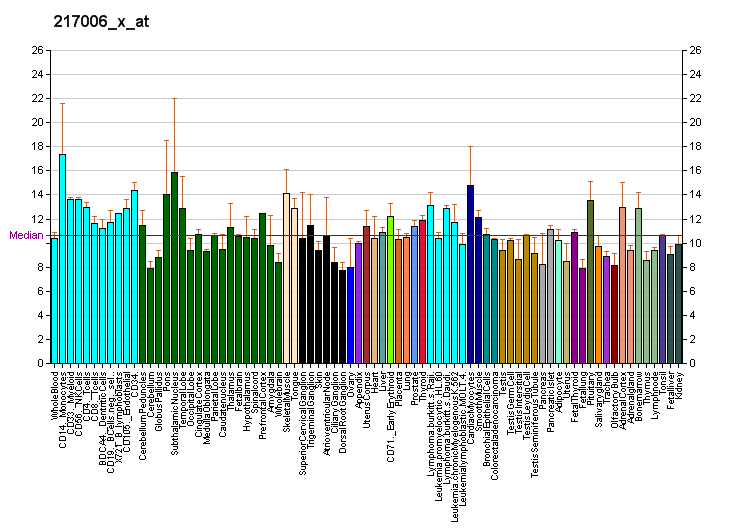

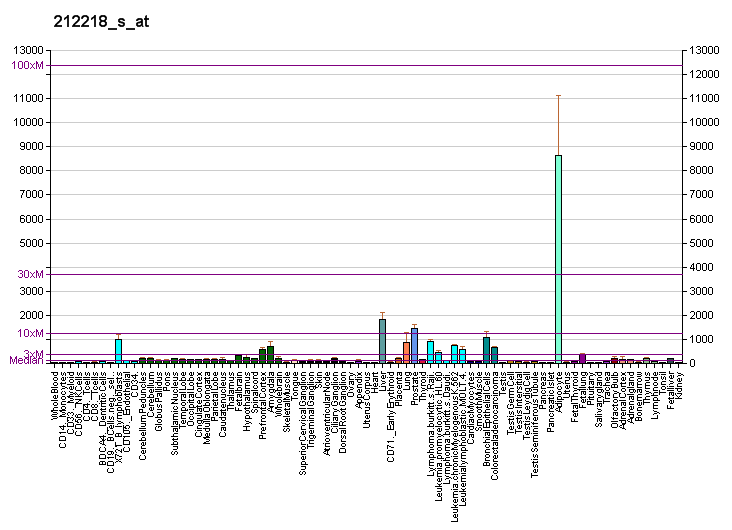
RNA expression pattern
Bgee	Human / Mouse (ortholog); Top expressed in: right hemisphere of cerebellum; skin of abdomen; skin of leg; abdominal fat; anterior pituitary; right lobe of liver; nipple; subcutaneous adipose tissue; right frontal lobe; right lung / Top expressed in: tunica adventitia of aorta; lactiferous gland; subcutaneous adipose tissue; tunica media of zone of aorta; brown adipose tissue; white adipose tissue; trachea; superior surface of tongue; intercostal muscle; parotid gland; More reference expression data
BioGPS	More reference expression data
Orthologs
Databases	NCBI: entry; OMA: entry
Species	Human	Mouse
Entrez	2194	14104
Ensembl	ENSG00000169710	ENSMUSG00000025153
UniProt	P49327	P19096
RefSeq (mRNA)	NM_004104	NM_007988
RefSeq (protein)	n/a	NP_032014
Location (UCSC)	Chr 17: 82.08 – 82.1 Mb	Chr 11: 120.7 – 120.72 Mb
PubMed search
- Wikidata
View/Edit Human	View/Edit Mouse

Fatty acid synthase

Identifiers
- EC no.: 2.3.1.85
- CAS no.: 9045-77-6

Databases
- BRENDA: enzyme data
- ExPASy: NiceZyme view
- KEGG: enzyme entry
- MetaCyc: metabolic pathway
- Rhea: reactions
- PDB structures: RCSB PDB PDBe PDBsum
- Gene Ontology: AmiGO / QuickGO
Search
- PMC: articles
- PubMed: articles
- NCBI: proteins

Fatty acid synthase (FAS) is an enzyme that in humans is encoded by the FASN gene.

Fatty acid synthase is a multi-enzyme protein that catalyzes fatty acid synthesis. It is not a single enzyme but a whole enzymatic system composed of two identical 272 kDa multifunctional polypeptides, in which substrates are handed from one functional domain to the next.

Its main function is to catalyze the synthesis of palmitate (C16:0, a long-chain saturated fatty acid) from acetyl-CoA and malonyl-CoA, in the presence of NADPH.

The fatty acids are synthesized by a series of decarboxylative Claisen condensation reactions from acetyl-CoA and malonyl-CoA. Following each round of elongation the beta keto group is reduced to the fully saturated carbon chain by the sequential action of a ketoreductase (KR), dehydratase (DH), and enoyl reductase (ER). The growing fatty acid chain is carried between these active sites while attached covalently to the phosphopantetheine prosthetic group of an acyl carrier protein (ACP), and is released by the action of a thioesterase (TE) upon reaching a carbon chain length of 16 (palmitic acid).

== Classes ==
There are two principal classes of fatty acid synthases.

- Type I systems utilise a single large, multifunctional polypeptide and are common to both animals and fungi (although the structural arrangement of fungal and animal syntheses differ). A Type I fatty acid synthase system is also found in the CMN group of bacteria (corynebacteria, mycobacteria, and nocardia). In these bacteria, the FAS I system produces palmitic acid, and cooperates with the FAS II system to produce a greater diversity of lipid products.
- Type II is found in archaea, bacteria and plant plastids, and the mitochondria of animals, including humans, and is characterized by the use of discrete, monofunctional enzymes for fatty acid synthesis. Inhibitors of this pathway (FASII) are being investigated as possible antibiotics.

The mechanism of FAS I and FAS II elongation and reduction is the same, as the domains of the FAS II enzymes are largely homologous to their domain counterparts in FAS I multienzyme polypeptides. However, the differences in the organization of the enzymes - integrated in FAS I, discrete in FAS II - gives rise to many important biochemical differences.

The evolutionary history of fatty acid synthases are very much intertwined with that of polyketide synthases (PKS). Polyketide synthases use a similar mechanism and homologous domains to produce secondary metabolite lipids. Furthermore, polyketide synthases also exhibit a Type I and Type II organization. FAS I in animals is thought to have arisen through modification of PKS I in fungi, whereas FAS I in fungi and the CMN group of bacteria seem to have arisen separately through the fusion of FAS II genes.

== Structure ==
Mammalian FAS consists of a homodimer of two identical protein subunits, in which three catalytic domains in the N-terminal section (-ketoacyl synthase (KS), malonyl/acetyltransferase (MAT), and dehydrase (DH)), are separated by a core region (known as the interdomain) of 600 residues from four C-terminal domains (enoyl reductase (ER), -ketoacyl reductase (KR), acyl carrier protein (ACP) and thioesterase (TE)). The interdomain region allows the two monomeric domains to form a dimer.

The conventional model for organization of FAS (see the 'head-to-tail' model on the right) is largely based on the observations that the bifunctional reagent 1,3-dibromopropanone (DBP) is able to crosslink the active site cysteine thiol of the KS domain in one FAS monomer with the phosphopantetheine prosthetic group of the ACP domain in the other monomer. Complementation analysis of FAS dimers carrying different mutations on each monomer has established that the KS and MAT domains can cooperate with the ACP of either monomer. and a reinvestigation of the DBP crosslinking experiments revealed that the KS active site Cys161 thiol could be crosslinked to the ACP 4'-phosphopantetheine thiol of either monomer. In addition, it has been recently reported that a heterodimeric FAS containing only one competent monomer is capable of palmitate synthesis.

The above observations seemed incompatible with the classical 'head-to-tail' model for FAS organization, and an alternative model has been proposed, predicting that the KS and MAT domains of both monomers lie closer to the center of the FAS dimer, where they can access the ACP of either subunit (see figure on the top right).

A low resolution X-ray crystallography structure of both pig (homodimer) and yeast FAS (heterododecamer) along with a ~6 Å resolution electron cryo-microscopy (cryo-EM) yeast FAS structure have been solved.

== Substrate shuttling mechanism ==
The solved structures of yeast FAS and mammalian FAS show two distinct organizations of highly conserved catalytic domains/enzymes in this multi-enzyme cellular machine. Yeast FAS has a highly efficient rigid barrel-like structure with 6 reaction chambers which synthesize fatty acids independently, while the mammalian FAS has an open flexible structure with only two reaction chambers. However, in both cases the conserved ACP acts as the mobile domain responsible for shuttling the intermediate fatty acid substrates to various catalytic sites. A first direct structural insight into this substrate shuttling mechanism was obtained by cryo-EM analysis, where ACP is observed bound to the various catalytic domains in the barrel-shaped yeast fatty acid synthase. The cryo-EM results suggest that the binding of ACP to various sites is asymmetric and stochastic, as also indicated by computer-simulation studies

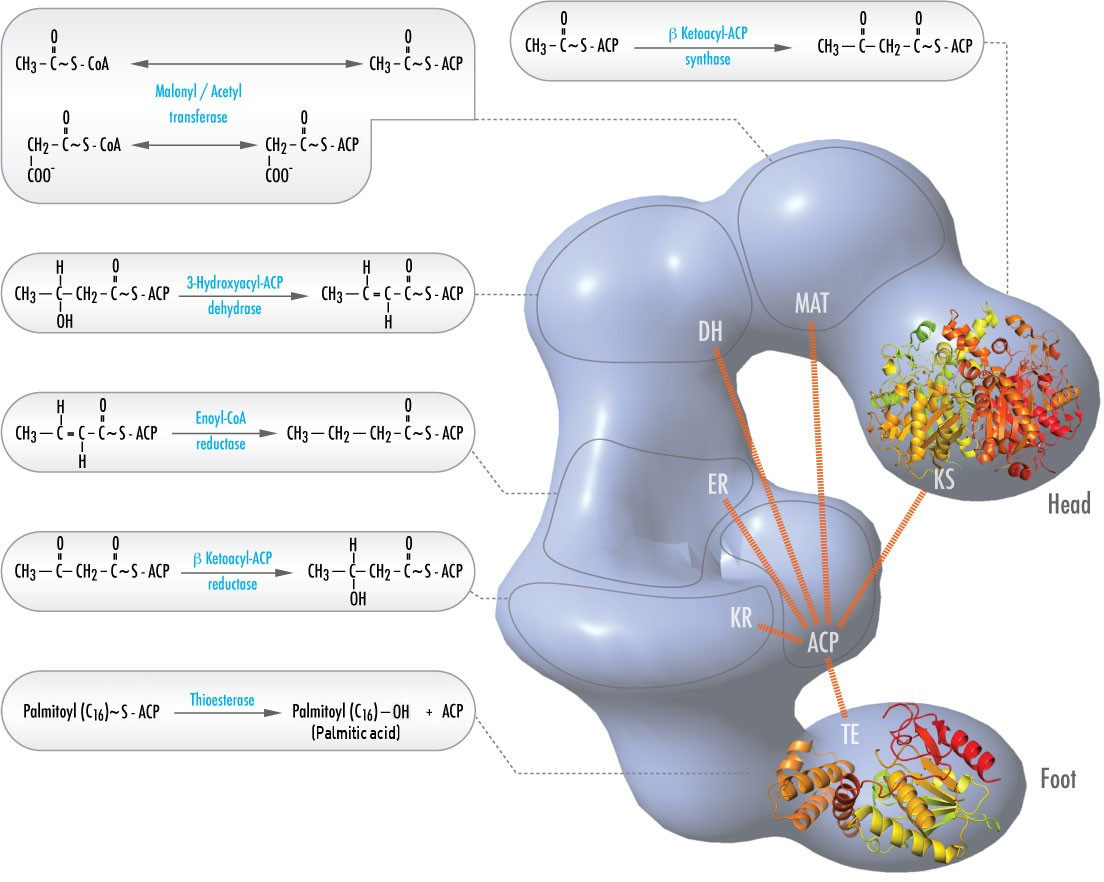
FAS revised model with positions of polypeptides, three catalytic domains and their corresponding reactions, visualization by Kosi Gramatikoff. Note that FAS is only active as a homodimer rather than the monomer pictured.

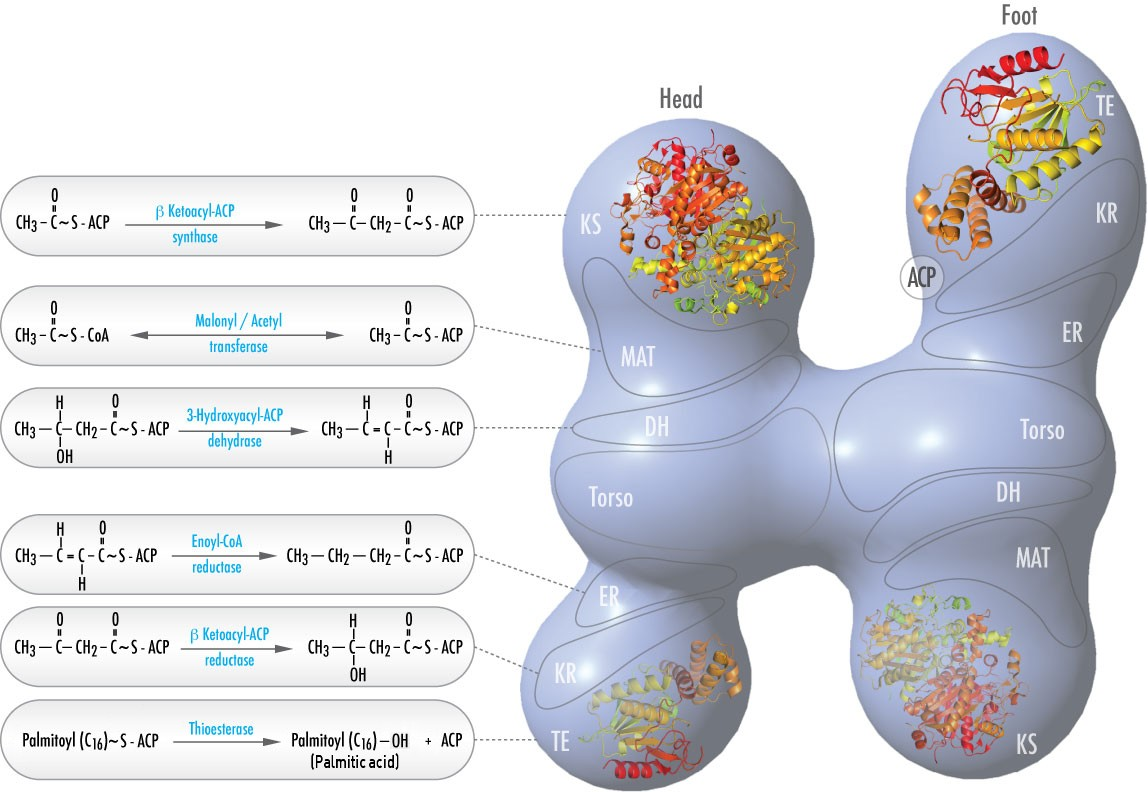
FAS 'head-to-tail' model with positions of polypeptides, three catalytic domains and their corresponding reactions, visualization by Kosi Gramatikoff.

== Regulation ==
Metabolism and homeostasis of fatty acid synthase is transcriptionally regulated by Upstream Stimulatory Factors (USF1 and USF2) and sterol regulatory element binding protein-1c (SREBP-1c) in response to feeding/insulin in living animals.

Although liver X receptors (LXRs) modulate the expression of sterol regulatory element binding protein-1c (SREBP-1c) in feeding, regulation of FAS by SREBP-1c is USF-dependent.

Acylphloroglucinols isolated from the fern Dryopteris crassirhizoma show a fatty acid synthase inhibitory activity.

== Clinical significance ==
The FASN gene has been investigated as a possible oncogene. FAS is upregulated in breast and gastric cancers, as well as being an indicator of poor prognosis, and so may be worthwhile as a chemotherapeutic target. FAS inhibitors are therefore an active area of drug discovery research.

FAS may also be involved in the production of an endogenous ligand for the nuclear receptor PPARalpha, the target of the fibrate drugs for hyperlipidemia, and is being investigated as a possible drug target for treating the metabolic syndrome. Orlistat which is a gastrointestinal lipase inhibitor also inhibits FAS and has a potential as a medicine for cancer.

In some cancer cell lines, this protein has been found to be fused with estrogen receptor alpha (ER-alpha), in which the N-terminus of FAS is fused in-frame with the C-terminus of ER-alpha.

An association with uterine leiomyomata has been reported.

== See also ==
- Discovery and development of gastrointestinal lipase inhibitors
- Fatty acid synthesis
- Fatty acid metabolism
- Fatty acid degradation
- Enoyl-acyl carrier protein reductase
- List of fatty acid metabolism disorders
