= USF2 =

Protein-coding gene in the species Homo sapiens

Identifiers
- Aliases: USF2, FIP, bHLHb12, upstream transcription factor 2, c-fos interacting
- External IDs: OMIM: 600390; MGI: 99961; GeneCards: USF2

Gene location (Human)
Chr.	Chromosome 19 (human)
Band	19q13.12	Start	35,268,962 bp
Band	19q13.12	End	35,279,821 bp

Gene location (Mouse)
Chr.	Chromosome 7 (mouse)
Band	7 B1|7 19.27 cM	Start	30,644,673 bp
Band	7 B1|7 19.27 cM	End	30,656,228 bp
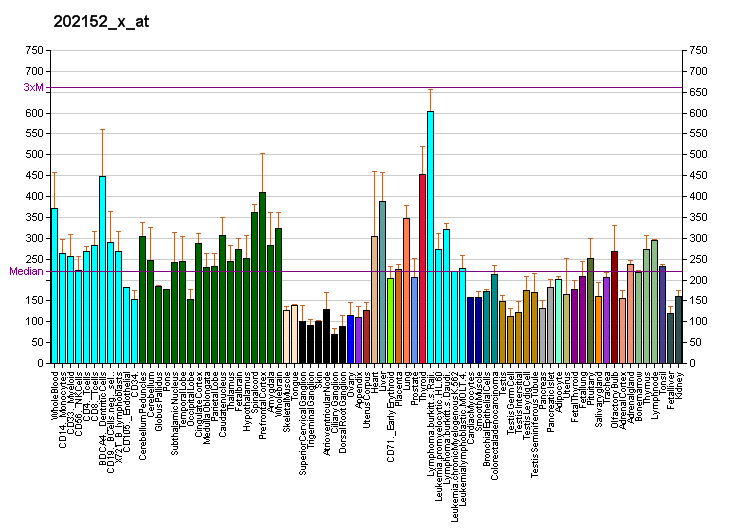

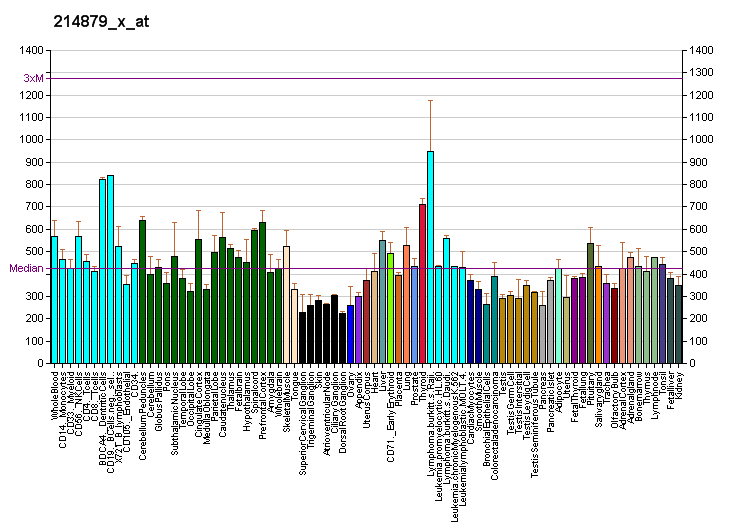

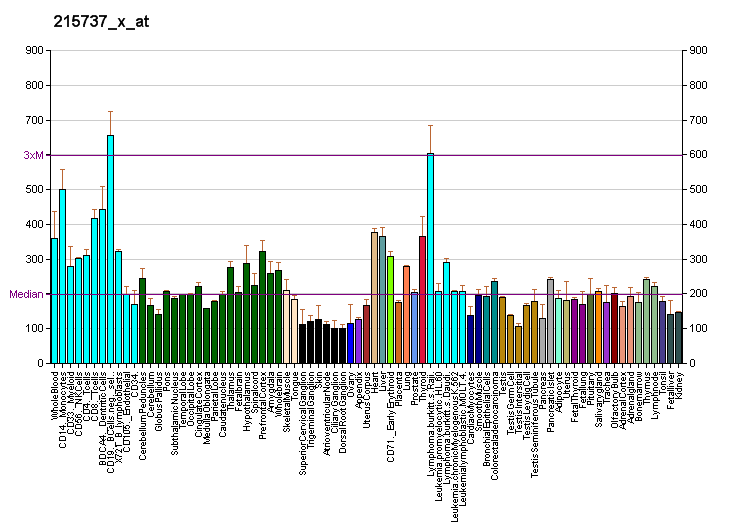
RNA expression pattern
Bgee	Human / Mouse (ortholog); Top expressed in: right hemisphere of cerebellum; apex of heart; right frontal lobe; C1 segment; ganglionic eminence; left ovary; anterior pituitary; right ovary; right lobe of thyroid gland; ventricular zone / Top expressed in: neural layer of retina; ventricular zone; granulocyte; superior frontal gyrus; lip; muscle of thigh; dentate gyrus of hippocampal formation granule cell; primary visual cortex; yolk sac; genital tubercle; More reference expression data
BioGPS	More reference expression data
Gene ontology
Molecular function	sequence-specific DNA binding; DNA binding; protein dimerization activity; protein homodimerization activity; DNA-binding transcription factor activity; bHLH transcription factor binding; protein binding; protein heterodimerization activity; transcription factor activity, RNA polymerase II distal enhancer sequence-specific binding; DNA-binding transcription factor activity, RNA polymerase II-specific
Cellular component	intracellular membrane-bounded organelle; nucleus; nucleoplasm
Biological process	regulation of transcription, DNA-templated; positive regulation of transcription from RNA polymerase II promoter by glucose; regulation of transcription by RNA polymerase II; late viral transcription; transcription by RNA polymerase II; transcription, DNA-templated; positive regulation of transcription, DNA-templated; regulation of transcription from RNA polymerase II promoter by glucose; lipid homeostasis; lactation; positive regulation of transcription by RNA polymerase II
Sources:Amigo / QuickGO
Orthologs
Databases	NCBI: entry; OMA: entry
Species	Human	Mouse
Entrez	7392	22282
Ensembl	ENSG00000105698	ENSMUSG00000058239
UniProt	Q15853	Q64705
RefSeq (mRNA)	NM_003367; NM_207291; NM_001321150	NM_011680
RefSeq (protein)	NP_001308079; NP_003358; NP_997174	NP_035810
Location (UCSC)	Chr 19: 35.27 – 35.28 Mb	Chr 7: 30.64 – 30.66 Mb
PubMed search
- Wikidata
View/Edit Human	View/Edit Mouse

Upstream stimulatory factor 2 is a protein that in humans is encoded by the USF2 gene.

== Function ==
This gene encodes a member of the basic helix-loop-helix leucine zipper family, and can function as a cellular transcription factor. The encoded protein can activate transcription through Pyridine-rich initiator (Inr) elements and E-box motifs. Two transcript variants encoding distinct isoforms have been identified for this gene.

== Interactions ==
USF2 has been shown to interact with USF1 (human gene), PPRC1 and BRCA1.

== Regulation ==
The USF2 gene is repressed by the microRNA miR-10a.
