= Aminoadipate-semialdehyde dehydrogenase =

Protein-coding gene in humans

AASDH

Identifiers
- Aliases: AASDH, ACSF4, LYS2, NRPS1098, NRPS998, aminoadipate-semialdehyde dehydrogenase
- External IDs: OMIM: 614365; MGI: 2442517; HomoloGene: 71711; GeneCards: AASDH; OMA:AASDH - orthologs
- EC number: 1.2.1.31

Gene location (Human)
Chr.	Chromosome 4 (human)
Band	4q12	Start	56,338,287 bp
Band	4q12	End	56,387,508 bp

Gene location (Mouse)
Chr.	Chromosome 5 (mouse)
Band	5|5 C3.3	Start	77,021,506 bp
Band	5|5 C3.3	End	77,053,361 bp
RNA expression pattern
Bgee	Human / Mouse (ortholog); Top expressed in: pancreatic ductal cell; nipple; corpus epididymis; gonad; testicle; caput epididymis; renal medulla; oocyte; tail of epididymis; mucosa of ileum / Top expressed in: Paneth cell; otolith organ; utricle; conjunctival fornix; fossa; ciliary body; iris; spermatocyte; condyle; hand; More reference expression data
BioGPS	n/a
Orthologs
Species	Human	Mouse
Entrez	132949	231326
Ensembl	ENSG00000157426	ENSMUSG00000055923
UniProt	Q4L235	Q80WC9
RefSeq (mRNA)	NM_001286668; NM_001286669; NM_001286670; NM_001286671; NM_001286672 NM_181806; NM_001323890; NM_001323892; NM_001323893; NM_001323899	NM_173765; NM_001377004
RefSeq (protein)	NP_001273597; NP_001273598; NP_001273599; NP_001273600; NP_001273601 NP_001310819; NP_001310821; NP_001310822; NP_001310828; NP_861522	NP_776126; NP_001363933
Location (UCSC)	Chr 4: 56.34 – 56.39 Mb	Chr 5: 77.02 – 77.05 Mb
PubMed search
- Wikidata
View/Edit Human	View/Edit Mouse

Aminoadipate-semialdehyde dehydrogenase is a protein that in humans is encoded by the AASDH gene.

== Function ==
This gene encodes a member of the non-ribosome peptide synthetase (NRPS) enzyme family. The encoded protein contains an AMP-binding domain, PP-binding (phosphopantetheine, or pantetheine 4'phosphate-binding) domain and the Pyrrolo-quinoline quinon (PQQ) binding domain. The protein is expressed in several adult tissues.
