= DHRS2 =

Protein-coding gene in the species Homo sapiens

Identifiers
- Aliases: DHRS2, HEP27, SDR25C1, dehydrogenase/reductase (SDR family) member 2, dehydrogenase/reductase 2
- External IDs: OMIM: 615194; MGI: 1918662; GeneCards: DHRS2

Gene location (Human)
Chr.	Chromosome 14 (human)
Band	14q11.2	Start	23,630,115 bp
Band	14q11.2	End	23,645,639 bp

Gene location (Mouse)
Chr.	Chromosome 14 (mouse)
Band	14 C3|14	Start	55,459,464 bp
Band	14 C3|14	End	55,478,892 bp
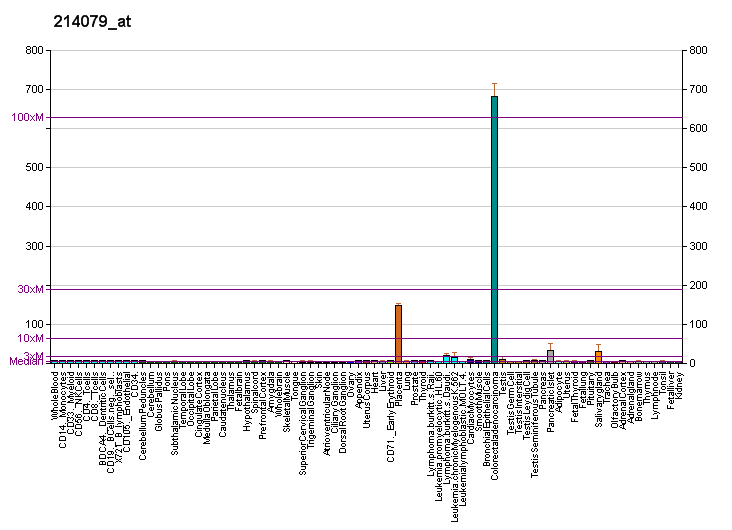

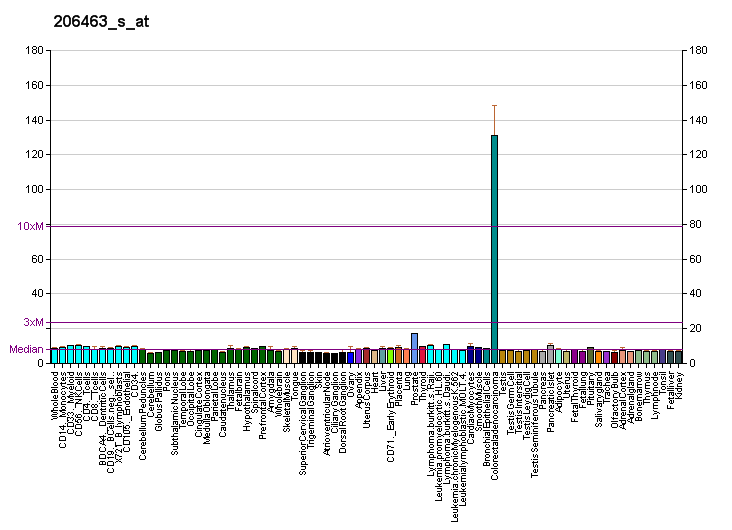
RNA expression pattern
Bgee	Human / Mouse (ortholog); Top expressed in: mucosa of urinary bladder; islet of Langerhans; parotid gland; right lobe of liver; spleen; gonad; left ovary; nipple; amniotic fluid; placenta / Top expressed in: secondary oocyte; primary oocyte; zygote; embryo; embryo; lower lip; upper lip; trigeminal ganglion; sexually immature organism; esophagus; More reference expression data
BioGPS	More reference expression data
Gene ontology
Molecular function	oxidoreductase activity; protein binding; carbonyl reductase (NADPH) activity
Cellular component	cytoplasm; mitochondrial matrix; nuclear envelope; mitochondrion; nucleus
Biological process	cellular response to oxidative stress; myeloid dendritic cell differentiation; negative regulation of apoptotic process; response to toxic substance; C21-steroid hormone metabolic process; negative regulation of cell population proliferation
Sources:Amigo / QuickGO
Orthologs
Databases	NCBI: entry; OMA: entry
Species	Human	Mouse
Entrez	10202	71412
Ensembl	ENSG00000100867	ENSMUSG00000022209
UniProt	Q13268	n/a
RefSeq (mRNA)	NM_005794; NM_182908; NM_001318835	NM_027790
RefSeq (protein)	NP_001305764; NP_005785; NP_878912	n/a
Location (UCSC)	Chr 14: 23.63 – 23.65 Mb	Chr 14: 55.46 – 55.48 Mb
PubMed search
- Wikidata
View/Edit Human	View/Edit Mouse

Dehydrogenase/reductase SDR family member 2 is an enzyme that in humans is encoded by the DHRS2 gene.
