= ALDH1L2 =

Protein-coding gene in humans

Identifiers
- Aliases: ALDH1L2, mtFDH, aldehyde dehydrogenase 1 family member L2
- External IDs: OMIM: 613584; MGI: 2444680; GeneCards: ALDH1L2
Enzyme activity
EC #	BRENDA	ExPASy	KEGG	MetaCyc
1.5.1.6	↗	↗	↗	↗

Gene location (Human)
Chr.	Chromosome 12 (human)
Band	12q23.3	Start	105,019,784 bp
Band	12q23.3	End	105,107,643 bp

Gene location (Mouse)
Chr.	Chromosome 10 (mouse)
Band	10|10 C1	Start	83,323,314 bp
Band	10|10 C1	End	83,370,004 bp
RNA expression pattern
Bgee	Human / Mouse (ortholog); Top expressed in: tibia; body of pancreas; stromal cell of endometrium; pancreatic epithelial cell; parotid gland; Achilles tendon; tendon of biceps brachii; islet of Langerhans; bone marrow cell; Descending thoracic aorta / Top expressed in: parotid gland; calvaria; lacrimal gland; body of femur; fossa; submandibular gland; atrium; umbilical cord; pancreas; islet of Langerhans; More reference expression data
BioGPS	n/a
Gene ontology
Molecular function	hydroxymethyl-, formyl- and related transferase activity; formyltetrahydrofolate dehydrogenase activity; oxidoreductase activity; catalytic activity; aldehyde dehydrogenase (NAD+) activity; oxidoreductase activity, acting on the aldehyde or oxo group of donors, NAD or NADP as acceptor
Cellular component	extracellular exosome; cytoplasm; mitochondrion; mitochondrial matrix; nucleus
Biological process	one-carbon metabolic process; biosynthesis; 10-formyltetrahydrofolate catabolic process; metabolism; folic acid metabolic process
Sources:Amigo / QuickGO
Orthologs
Databases	NCBI: entry; OMA: entry
Species	Human	Mouse
Entrez	160428	216188
Ensembl	ENSG00000136010	ENSMUSG00000020256
UniProt	Q3SY69	Q8K009
RefSeq (mRNA)	NM_001034173	NM_153543
RefSeq (protein)	NP_001029345	NP_705771
Location (UCSC)	Chr 12: 105.02 – 105.11 Mb	Chr 10: 83.32 – 83.37 Mb
PubMed search
- Wikidata
View/Edit Human	View/Edit Mouse

Aldehyde dehydrogenase 1 family, member L2 also known as ALDH1L2 is an enzyme that in humans is encoded by the ALDH1L2 gene. ALDH1L2 is the mitochondrial isoform of a similar enzyme, ALDH1L1, which converts 10-formyltetrahydrofolate to tetrahydrofolate and carbon dioxide.
