= Acyl carrier protein =

Cofactor of both fatty acid and polyketide biosynthesis

Acyl/peptidyl carrier protein
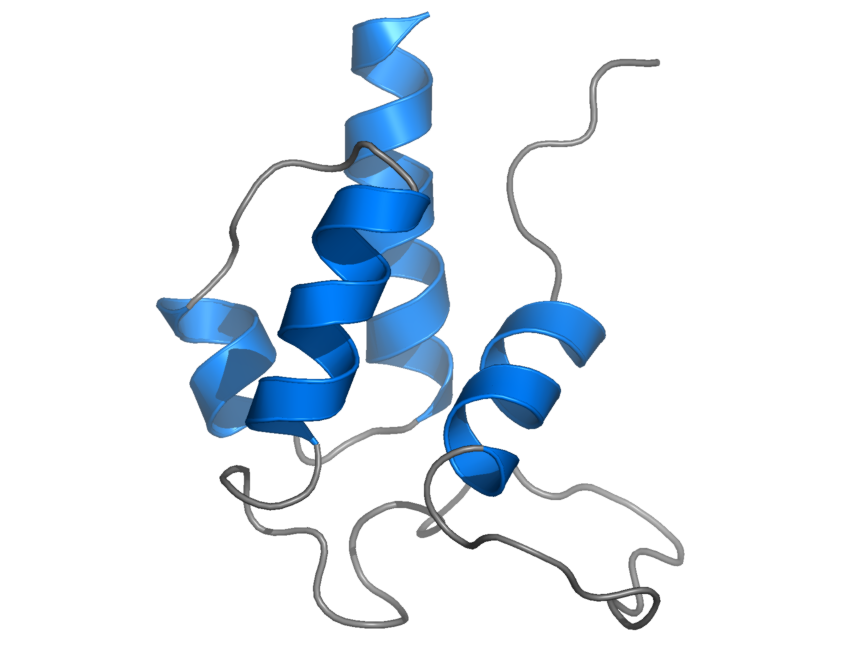
- Streptomyces coelicolor actinorhodin polyketide synthase acyl carrier protein - PDB: 2AF8

Identifiers
- Symbol: ACP-like_sf
- Pfam: PF00550
- Pfam clan: CL0314
- InterPro: IPR036736
- PROSITE: PDOC00012
- CATH: 1nq4
- SCOP2: 1nq4 / SCOPe / SUPFAM
Available protein structures:
- PDB: IPR036736 PF00550 (ECOD; PDBsum)
- AlphaFold: IPR036736; PF00550

The acyl carrier protein (ACP), aryl carrier protein (ArCP), and the peptidyl carrier protein (PCP) are a family of protein cofactors that participate in fatty acid (acyl), polyketide (acyl and aryl), and nonribosomal peptide (peptidyl) biosynthesis. The growing molecule is bound to the A(r)/PCP via a thioester derived from the distal thiol of a 4'-phosphopantetheine (PPant) moiety.

A(r)/PCPs are found in bacteria and eukaryotes (including humans) alike. The E. coli version (EcacpP) is the best studied. In E. coli, the ACP is one of the most abundant cytosolic proteins at 0.25% of the total soluble protein (by molecule count). It is small, very acidic, and very soluble. EcacpP works as a cofactor in the synthesis of both long and short chain fatty acids in the bacterium. It interacts with fatty acid synthase proteins that "flips" the growing fatty acid chain out of the ACP's internal cavity and modifies it. This kind of setup where the ACP exists as a free-floating protein is called Type II. An alternative is the Type I system, where a large protein contains several synthase domains as well as its own ACP domain. The ACP domain is pass around by the synthase domains to build a molecule. Polyketide synthases and nonribosomal peptide synthetases interact with their carrier proteins in a similar way. There is a similar distinction in how they are organized into type I and type II.

Plant ACPs participate in the biosynthesis of fatty acids, exploited by humans in the form of vegetable oils. Many polyketides and nonribosomal peptides produced with the help of A(r)/PCP are useful medications.

== Structure ==
The A/PCPs are small negatively charged α-helical bundle proteins with a high degree of structural and amino acid similarity. The structures of a number of acyl carrier proteins have been solved using various NMR and crystallography techniques.

== Biosynthesis ==
The A(r)/PCP is produced by the ribosome in the empty (apo) form. This form cannot function as a carrier protein. Only when acyl carrier protein synthase (ACPS) attaches the 4'-phosphopantetheine (PPant) prosthetic group to a serine residue is an active A(r)/PCP produced. The PPant group comes from coenzyme A.

== Human proteins ==
Human genes containing a ACP domain include:

- AASDH
- ALDH1L1
- ALDH1L2
- FASN
- NDUFAB1 (mtACP)

Of these, mtACP is a "type II" ACP. All of these are processed by the human ACPS.
