= ALDH1L1 =

Protein-coding gene in the species Homo sapiens

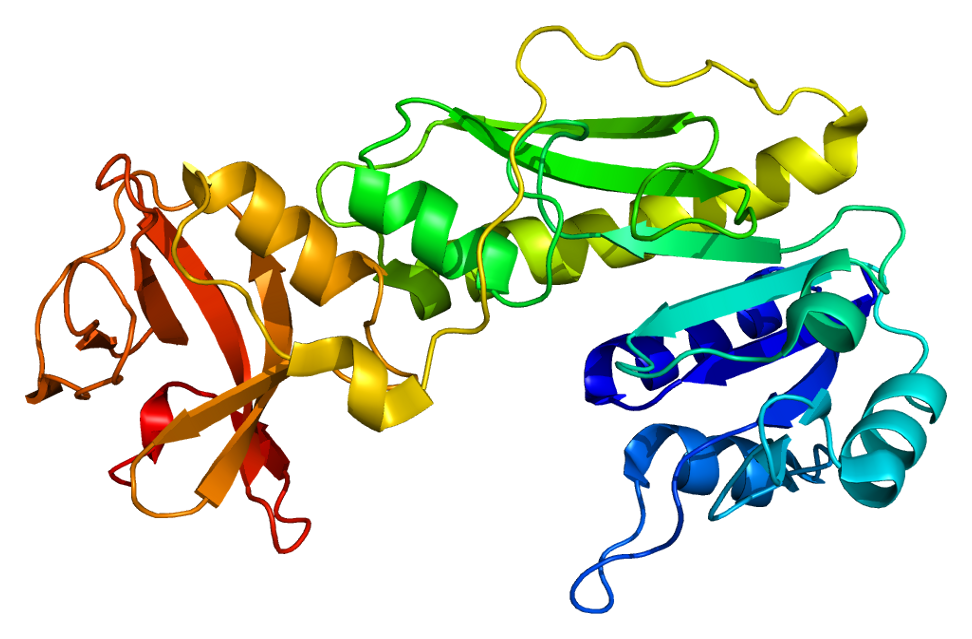

Identifiers
- Aliases: ALDH1L1, 10-FTHFDH, 10-fTHF, FDH, FTHFD, aldehyde dehydrogenase 1 family member L1
- External IDs: OMIM: 600249; MGI: 1340024; GeneCards: ALDH1L1
Available structures
| PDB | Ortholog search: PDBe RCSB |
| PDB | List of PDB id codes 2BW0, 2CFI, 2CQ8 |
Enzyme activity
| EC # | BRENDA | ExPASy | KEGG | MetaCyc |
|---|---|---|---|---|
| 1.5.1.6 | ↗ | ↗ | ↗ | ↗ |

Gene location (Human)
| Chr. | Chromosome 3 (human) |
| Band | 3q21.3 | Start | 126,103,562 bp |
| Band | 3q21.3 | End | 126,197,994 bp |

Gene location (Mouse)
| Chr. | Chromosome 6 (mouse) |
| Band | 6|6 D1 | Start | 90,463,409 bp |
| Band | 6|6 D1 | End | 90,577,185 bp |
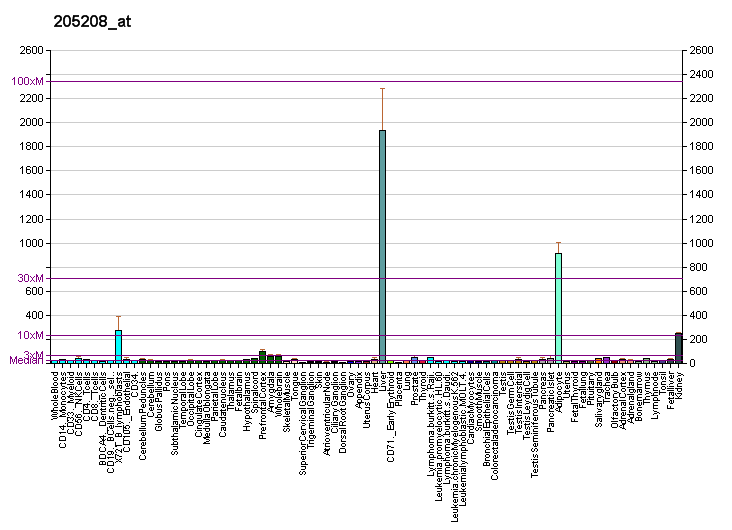
RNA expression pattern
| Bgee | Human / Mouse (ortholog); Top expressed in: right lobe of liver; olfactory zone of nasal mucosa; human kidney; muscle of thigh; parotid gland; gastrocnemius muscle; optic nerve; glutes; gastric mucosa; caudate nucleus / Top expressed in: left lobe of liver; right kidney; human kidney; proximal tubule; left colon; intestinal villus; jejunum; adrenal gland; white adipose tissue; optic nerve; More reference expression data |
| BioGPS | More reference expression data |
Gene ontology
| Molecular function | formyltetrahydrofolate dehydrogenase activity; oxidoreductase activity; hydroxymethyl-, formyl- and related transferase activity; catalytic activity; aldehyde dehydrogenase (NAD+) activity; oxidoreductase activity, acting on the aldehyde or oxo group of donors, NAD or NADP as acceptor |
| Cellular component | extracellular exosome; mitochondrion; cytoplasm; cytosol |
| Biological process | metabolism; one-carbon metabolic process; biosynthesis; 10-formyltetrahydrofolate catabolic process; folic acid metabolic process |
Sources:Amigo / QuickGO
Orthologs
| Databases | NCBI: entry; OMA: entry |
| Species | Human | Mouse |
| Entrez | 10840 | 107747 |
| Ensembl | ENSG00000144908 | ENSMUSG00000030088 |
| UniProt | O75891 | Q8R0Y6 |
| RefSeq (mRNA) | NM_001270364; NM_001270365; NM_012190; NM_144776 | NM_027406; NM_001356412 |
| RefSeq (protein) | NP_001257293; NP_001257294; NP_036322 | NP_081682; NP_001343341 |
| Location (UCSC) | Chr 3: 126.1 – 126.2 Mb | Chr 6: 90.46 – 90.58 Mb |
| PubMed search |
- Wikidata
| View/Edit Human | View/Edit Mouse |

10-formyltetrahydrofolate dehydrogenase is an enzyme that in humans is encoded by the ALDH1L1 gene.

The protein encoded by this gene catalyzes the conversion of 10-formyltetrahydrofolate, nicotinamide adenine dinucleotide phosphate (NADP), and water to tetrahydrofolate, NADPH, and carbon dioxide. The encoded protein belongs to the aldehyde dehydrogenase family and is responsible for formate oxidation in vivo. Deficiencies in this gene can result in an accumulation of formate and subsequent methanol poisoning.
