= Tylactone synthase =

Tylactone synthase or TYLS is a Type 1 polyketide synthase. TYLS is found in strains of Streptomyces fradiae and responsible for the synthesis of the macrolide ring, tylactone, the precursor of an antibiotic, tylosin. TYLS is composed of five large multi-functional proteins, TylGI-V. Each protein contains either one or two modules. Each module consists of a minimum of a Ketosynthase (KS), an Acyltransferase (AT), and an Acyl carrier protein (ACP) but may also contain a Ketoreductase (KR), Dehydrotase (DH), and Enoyl Reductase (ER) for additional reduction reactions. The domains of TYLS have similar activity domains to those found in other Type I polyketide synthase such as 6-Deoxyerythronolide B synthase (DEBS). The TYLS system also contains a loading module consisting of a ketosynthase‐like decarboxylase domain, an acyltransferase, and acyl carrier protein. The terminal Thioesterase terminates tylactone synthesis by cyclizing the macrolide ring. After the TYLS completes tylactone synthesis, the tylactone molecule is modified by oxidation at C-20 and C-23 and glycosylation of mycaminose, mycinose, and mycarose to produce tylosin.

== Structure and function ==
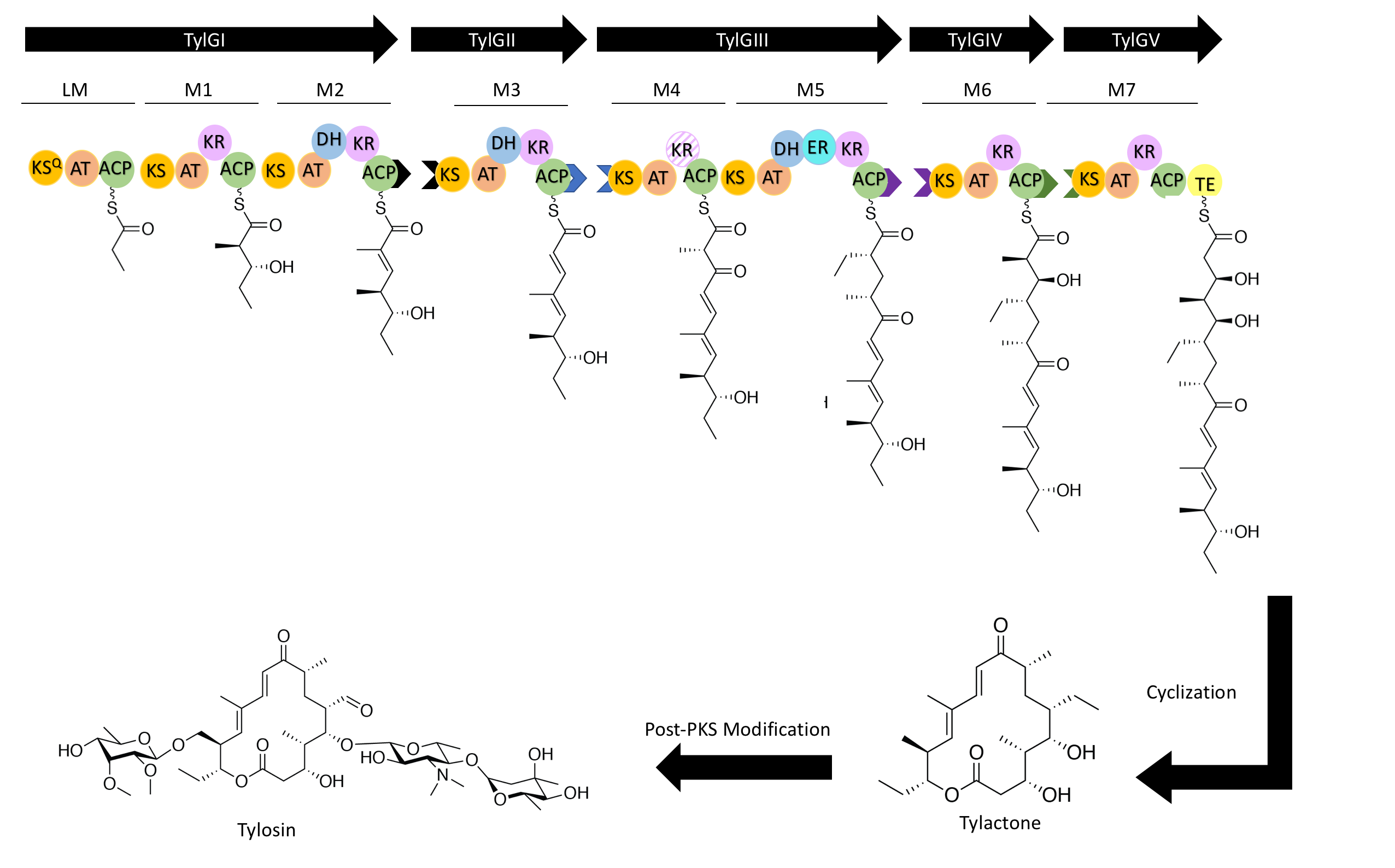
TYLS System by module with domains and products displayed. Tylactone post-PKS processing to Tylosin indicated. MX indicates module where X is module number.

=== TylGI ===
TylGI initiates synthesis via the loading module. The loading module contains a ketosynthase‐like decarboxylase domain (KS^{Q}) that decarboxylates the methylmalonyl-CoA loaded onto the ACP via the AT. This results in a propionate molecule, which the ACP passes to the KS of module 1. Module 1 extends the propionate by loading methylmalonate onto the ACP and catalyzing a Claisen condensation with the propionate bound to the KS. The diketide product is then reduced by the KR on module 1 and the substrate is transferred via the ACP on module 1 to the KS of module 2. Module 2 loads the ACP with methylmalonate via the module 2 AT followed by a Claisen condensation with the diketide bound to the KS and a KR-mediated reduction, a reaction sequence similar to that of module 1. The DH then catalyzes dehydration resulting in an ACP bound triketide. The triketide is then passed via the ACP of module 2 to the KS of module 3 on TylGII via docking domains. Docking domains are large proteins with relatively weak affinities (Kd ≈ 20–100 μM) that are fused to the complementary C and N terminuses of interacting polyketide synthase polypeptides.

=== TylGII ===
The AT of module 3 loads malonyl-CoA onto the ACP, followed by a Claisen condensation with the bound triketide, a KR-mediated reduction and dehydration catalyzed by the DH. The tetraketide is then passed to module 4 on TylGIII paired docking domains.

=== TylGIII ===
The AT of module 4 loads methylmalonyl-CoA onto the module 4 ACP and catalyzes a Claisen condensation with the bound tetraketide. However, since module 4 contains an inactive KR domain, the β-ketone condensation product is maintained. The AT on module 5 selects for ethylmalonyl-CoA and catalyzes a Claisen condensation followed by reduction via the KR and dehydration via the DH resulting in an alkene. The ER then saturates the alkene product. The hexaketide product of TylGIII is passed to the KS on module 6 on TylGIV via docking domain interactions.

=== TylGIV ===
Module 6 loads methylmalonyl CoA onto the ACP and catalyzes a Claisen condensation followed by a β-keto reduction by the KR domain. The heptaketide product is then passed to the KS on module 7 on TylGV via paired docking domains on TylGIV.

=== TylGV ===
Module 7 adds two carbon atoms via malonyl-CoA loaded onto the ACP, followed by the same series of reactions as those catalyzed by module 2. The linear octaketide is then cyclized via the Thioesterase domain to form the 16- membered ring of tylactone.

== Engineering applications ==
Because polyketide synthases catalyze stereospecific reactions, there is interest in engineering new molecules via PKS engineering. Efforts to engineer a hybrid PKS have met with some success. A team from Lilly Research Laboratories designed a hybrid tylactone/platenolide synthase that was able to accept the propionate substrate from the TYLS loading module instead of acetate, the natural precursor in the platenolide synthase system. This led to the production of a novel hybrid macrolactone. Other efforts have engineered systems by expressing a chalcomycin synthase genes along with the TYLS system. This points to the potential of coexpressing homologous PKS systems for the production of new products, however the high specificity of protein-protein interactions limits chimeric PKS engineering.

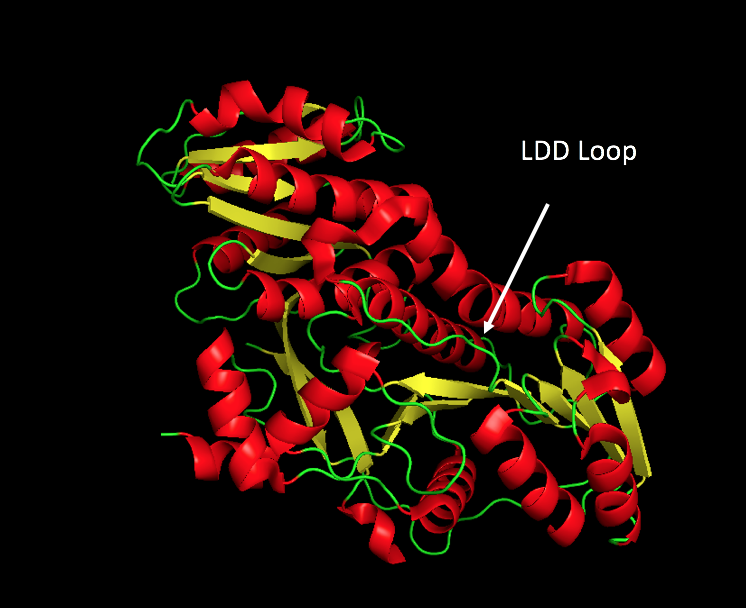
TYLS KR1 with Loading Module loop indicated. The loop facilitates intermodular interaction.

Biosynthesis reactions that interchange the KR domain from TYLS with the KR domain from DEBS lead to products with different stereochemistry. Other studies have elucidated the stereospecificity of the DEBS DH domain by co-incubating the DEBS DH domain with the TYLS KR from module 1 and comparing the product to that produced by the DEBS system.
