= Andrimid =

Bacterial alkaloid

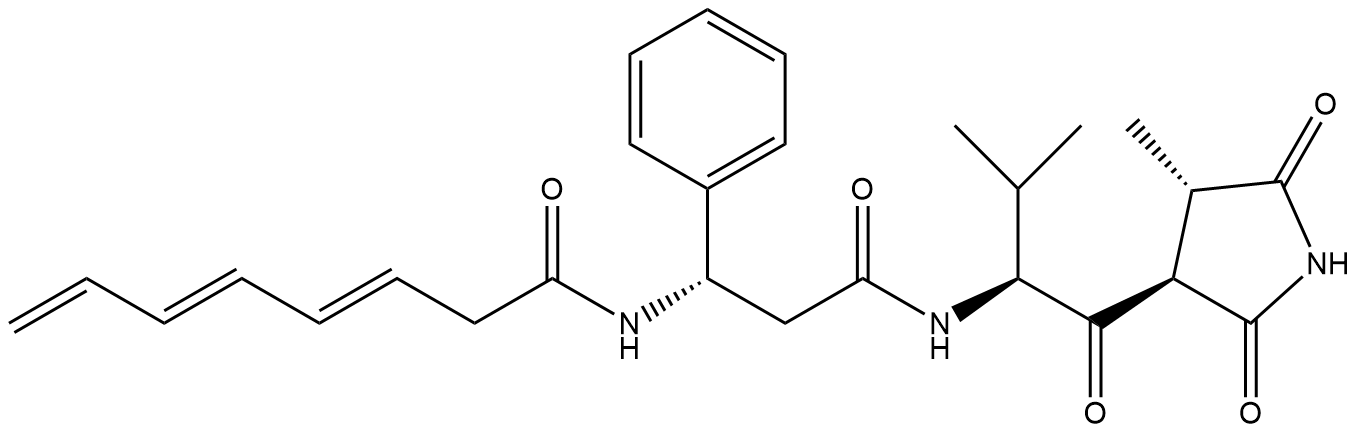

Identifiers
- IUPAC name: (2E,4E,6E)-N-(1S)-3-(2S)-3-methyl-1-(3R,4S)-4-methyl-2,5-dioxopyrrolidin-3-yl-1-oxobutan-2-yl-amino-3-oxo-1-phenylpropyl-octa-2,4,6-trienamide
- CAS Number: 108868-95-7
- PubChem CID: 636857
- ChemSpider: 552562
- KEGG: C22681
- ChEBI: CHEBI:216634
- ChEMBL: ChEMBL425874

Chemical and physical data
- Formula: C_{27}H_{33}N_{3}O_{5}
- Molar mass: 479.577 g·mol^{−1}
- 3D model (JSmol): Interactive image
- SMILES: CC=CC=CC=CC(=O)NC(CC(=O)NC(C(C)C)C(=O)C1C(C(=O)NC1=O)C)C2=CC=CC=C2
- InChI: InChI=1S/C27H33N3O5/c1-5-6-7-8-12-15-21(31)28-20(19-13-10-9-11-14-19)16-22(32)29-24(17(2)3)25(33)23-18(4)26(34)30-27(23)35/h5-15,17-18,20,23-24H,16H2,1-4H3,(H,28,31)(H,29,32)(H,30,34,35)/b6-5+,8-7+,15-12+/t18-,20-,23+,24-/m0/s1; Key:OHDXGZAYYBMHCY-QSUIEZAASA-N

Andrimid is an antibiotic natural product that is produced by the marine bacterium Vibrio coralliilyticus. Andrimid is an inhibitor of fatty acid biosynthesis by blocking the carboxyl transfer reaction of acetyl-CoA carboxylase (ACC).

Andrimid contains a pseudopeptide backbone and is synthesized through the polyketide synthase (PKS) and nonribosomal peptide synthetase (NRPS) pathways. Amino acids are added by the NRPS pathway which loads amino acid monomer units into the growing chain during the molecular assembly line.

== Biosynthesis ==
Abbreviations: ketosynthase (KS), chain length factor (CLF), dehydrogenase (DH), ketoreductase (KR), thiolation (T), transglutaminase (TG), adenylation (A), condensation (C), thioesterase (TE).

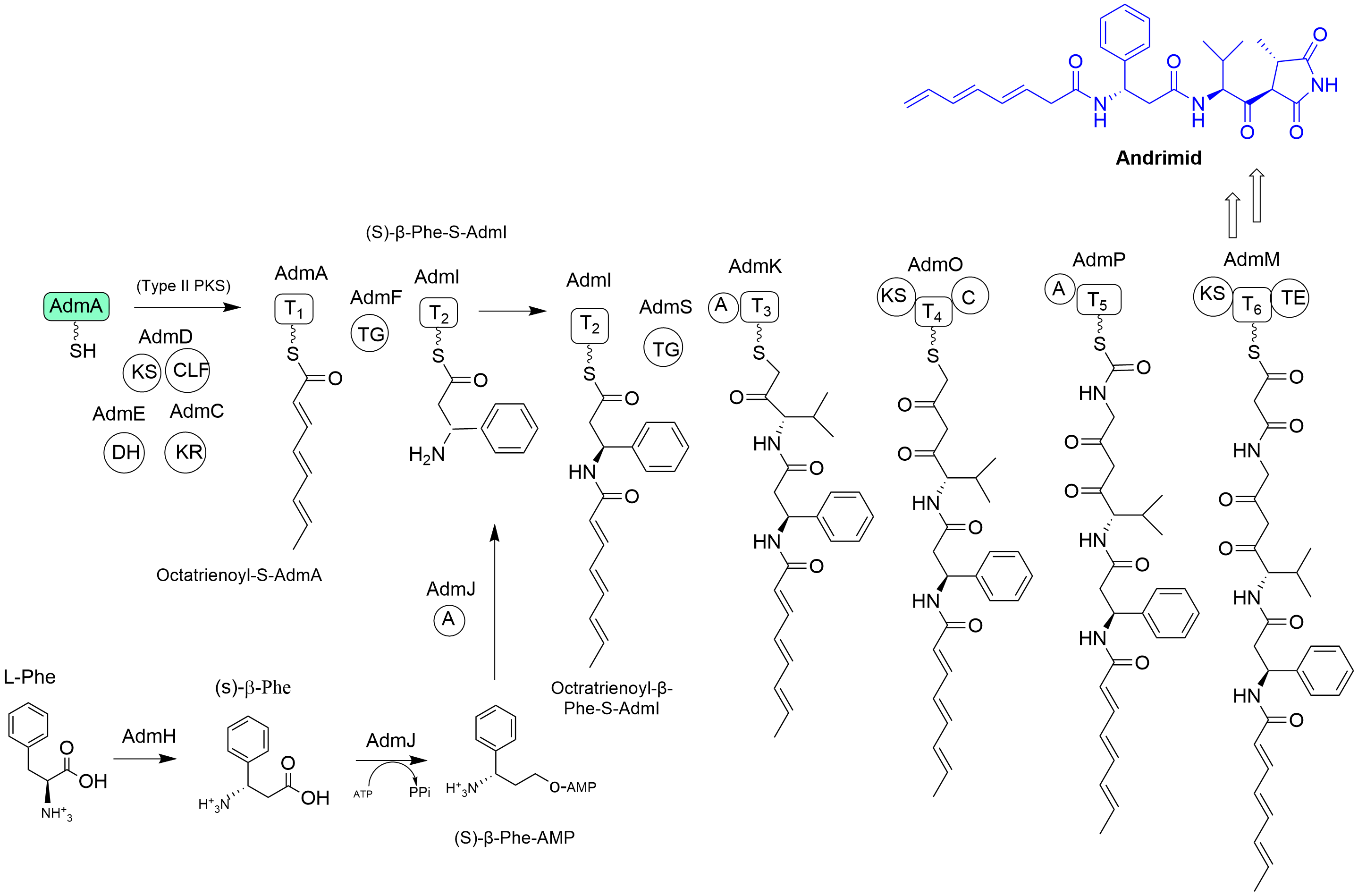
Andrimid is derived from three amino acids which are phenylalanine, valine, and glycine. Phenylalanine is converted to its other conformation, while valine and glycine residues have been elongated by two carbons derived by malonyl units. To incorporate the phenylalanine moiety into the biosynthesize of Andrimid, L-Phe must first be converted to (S)-β-Phe by the aminomutase AdmH. (S)-β-Phe reacts with ATP to active (S)-β-Phe-AMP by the A domain AdmJ which incorporates (S)-β-Phe onto the holo-AdmI(HS-AdmI), forming (S)-β-Phe-S-AdmI. AdmF catalyzes the formation of the octratrienoyl chain and the amine group of alpha-phenylalanine by acylation of its active site cysteine forming the Octratrienoyl-β-Phe-S-AdmI. The hybrid biosynthesis goes through six T domains before final tailoring to form the natural product Andrimid. Additional characteristics of the Andrimid assembly line are the beginning enzymes such as AdmH containing the aminomutase, AdmJ containing the β-Phe adenylation (A) domain which serves as the gatekeepers of the biosynthesis for determining which aromatic amino acid is used by the transglutaminase homologue AdmF. AdmF uses acyl S-T domain and β-aminoacyl-S-T domain to form the amine bond. Furthermore, the three amino acid used in Andrimid are incorporated into the assembly line by AdmH and AdmJ. (S)-β-Phe is generated by AdmH and incorporated by AdmJ. As for the other two amino acids which are valine and glycine, they must first undergo an addition of two carbons by the PKS modules AdmO and AdmM. A total of five proteins are used for andrimid biosynthesis to create the chain initiation step which are AdmA, AdnI, AdnJ, AdmF, and AdmH. During the PKS II pathway, malonyl-CoA is loaded onto the acyl carrier protein (ACP) which is transferred to the active site of ketosynthase (KS), releasing acetyl CoA to generate malonyl-CoA. This reaction undergoes chain elongation using malonyl-coenzyme A (CoA) following ketoreductase (CLF, DH, and KR). Note, the PKS II pathway is a systematic scheme, since there are not sufficient studies that demonstrate a clear route of the enzymes used for this chain elongation step of the fatty acid biosynthesis.
