= MCAT (disambiguation) =

MCAT is the Medical College Admission Test.

MCAT, MCat or M-Cat may also refer to:

- MCAT Pakistan, now known as NMDCAT (National Medical and Dental College Admission Test)

== Science ==
- (acyl-carrier-protein) S-malonyltransferase, an enzyme
- MCAT (gene), a gene that in humans encodes the enzyme malonyl CoA-acyl carrier protein transacylase, mitochondrial
- Mephedrone, a stimulant
- Methcathinone, a stimulant
- Moraxella catarrhalis, a Gram-negative bacteria
- Storage Resource Broker, Metadata Catalog

== Entertainment ==
- m.c.A.T (born 1961), Japanese musician and producer born Aquio Togashi
- Monstercat, a Canadian electronic dance music record label

== Transportation ==
- Middlesex County Area Transit, a bus network in Middlesex County, New Jersey
- Manatee County Area Transit
