= 3-oxoacyl-ACP synthase, mitochondrial =

Enzyme found in humans

OXSM

Identifiers
- Aliases: OXSM, FASN2D, KASI, KS, 3-oxoacyl-ACP synthase, mitochondrial, CEM1
- External IDs: OMIM: 610324; MGI: 1918397; GeneCards: OXSM
Available structures
PDB	Ortholog search: PDBe RCSB
PDB	List of PDB id codes 2C9H, 2IWY, 2IWZ
Enzyme activity
EC #	BRENDA	ExPASy	KEGG	MetaCyc
2.3.1.41	↗	↗	↗	↗

Gene location (Human)
Chr.	Chromosome 3 (human)
Band	3p24.2	Start	25,782,917 bp
Band	3p24.2	End	25,794,534 bp

Gene location (Mouse)
Chr.	Chromosome 14 (mouse)
Band	14|14 A1	Start	6,219,955 bp
Band	14|14 A1	End	6,231,111 bp
RNA expression pattern
Bgee	Human / Mouse (ortholog); Top expressed in: right lobe of liver; left testis; testicle; right testis; gonad; sperm; mucosa of transverse colon; body of pancreas; rectum; islet of Langerhans / Top expressed in: left lobe of liver; intercostal muscle; brown adipose tissue; granulocyte; left colon; parotid gland; myocardium of ventricle; subcutaneous adipose tissue; right kidney; human kidney; More reference expression data
BioGPS	n/a
Gene ontology
Molecular function	transferase activity; 3-oxoacyl-[acyl-carrier-protein synthase activity]; acyltransferase activity; catalytic activity; acyltransferase activity, transferring groups other than amino-acyl groups
Cellular component	mitochondrion; cytosol
Biological process	short-chain fatty acid biosynthetic process; metabolism; fatty acid biosynthetic process; acyl-CoA metabolic process; medium-chain fatty acid biosynthetic process; fatty acid metabolic process; lipid metabolism
Sources:Amigo / QuickGO
Orthologs
Databases	NCBI: entry; OMA: entry
Species	Human	Mouse
Entrez	54995	71147
Ensembl	ENSG00000151093	ENSMUSG00000021786
UniProt	Q9NWU1	Q9D404
RefSeq (mRNA)	NM_001145391; NM_017897	NM_027695; NM_001359882; NM_001359883
RefSeq (protein)	NP_001138863; NP_060367	NP_081971; NP_001346811; NP_001346812
Location (UCSC)	Chr 3: 25.78 – 25.79 Mb	Chr 14: 6.22 – 6.23 Mb
PubMed search
- Wikidata
View/Edit Human	View/Edit Mouse

Beta-ketoacyl synthase, N-terminal domain
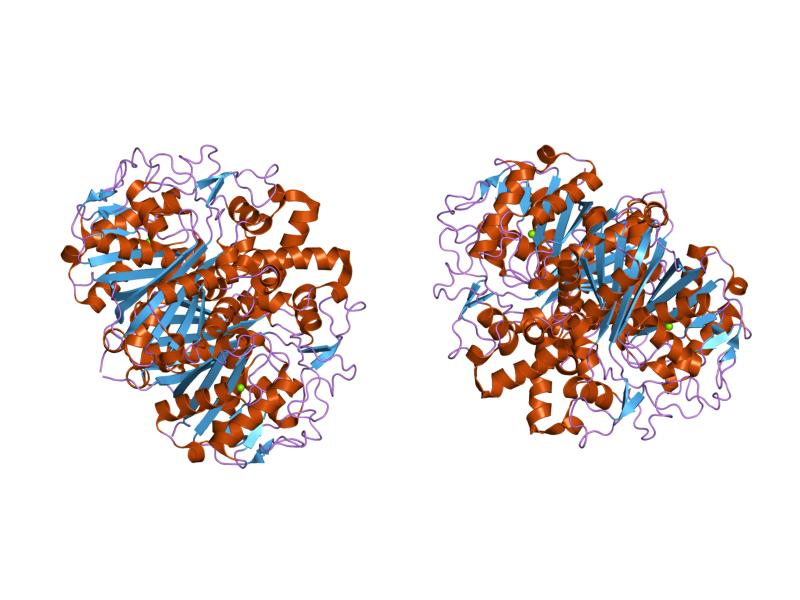
- the crystal structure of beta-ketoacyl-[acyl carrier protein] synthase ii from streptococcus pneumoniae, triclinic form

Identifiers
- Symbol: ketoacyl-synt
- Pfam: PF00109
- Pfam clan: CL0046
- InterPro: IPR014030
- PROSITE: PDOC00529
- SCOP2: 1kas / SCOPe / SUPFAM
Available protein structures:
- PDB: IPR014030 PF00109 (ECOD; PDBsum)
- AlphaFold: IPR014030; PF00109

Beta-ketoacyl synthase, C-terminal domain
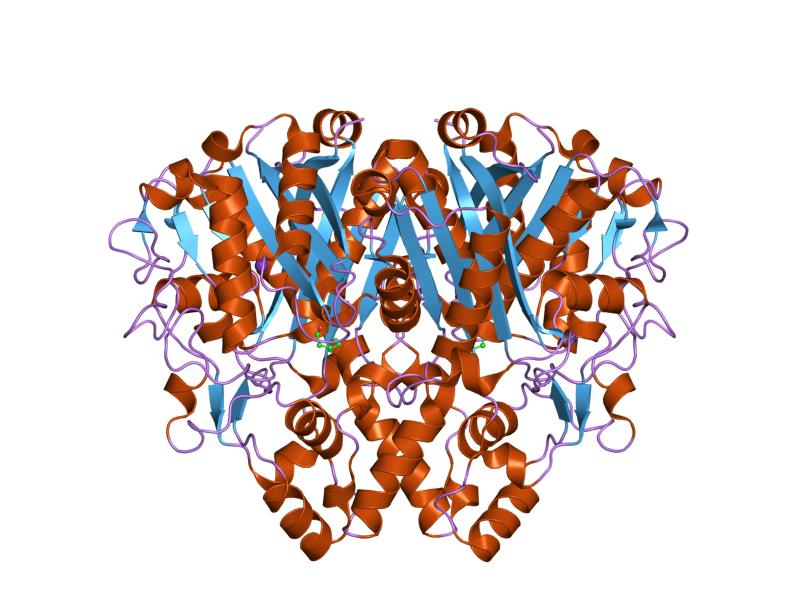
- arabidopsis thaliana mitochondrial beta-ketoacyl acp synthase hexanoic acid complex

Identifiers
- Symbol: Ketoacyl-synt_C
- Pfam: PF02801
- Pfam clan: CL0046
- InterPro: IPR014031
- PROSITE: PDOC00529
- SCOP2: 1kas / SCOPe / SUPFAM
Available protein structures:
- PDB: IPR014031 PF02801 (ECOD; PDBsum)
- AlphaFold: IPR014031; PF02801

3-oxoacyl-[acyl-carrier-protein] synthase, mitochondrial, also ambiguously called beta-ketoacyl-ACP synthase, is an enzyme that in humans is encoded by the OXSM gene. This enzyme is involved in fatty acid synthesis.

It typically uses malonyl-CoA as a carbon source to elongate ACP-bound acyl species, resulting in the formation of ACP-bound β-ketoacyl species such as acetoacetyl-ACP.

Beta-ketoacyl-ACP synthase is a highly conserved enzyme that is found in almost all life on earth as a domain in fatty acid synthase (FAS). FAS exists in two types, aptly named type I and II. In animals, fungi, and lower eukaryotes, Beta-ketoacyl-ACP synthases make up one of the catalytic domains of larger multifunctional proteins (Type I), whereas in most prokaryotes as well as in plastids and mitochondria, Beta-ketoacyl-ACP synthases are separate protein chains that usually form dimers (Type II). Beta-ketoacyl-ACP synthase III, perhaps the most well known of this family of enzymes, catalyzes a Claisen condensation between acetyl CoA and malonyl ACP. The image below reveals how CoA fits in the active site as a substrate of synthase III.

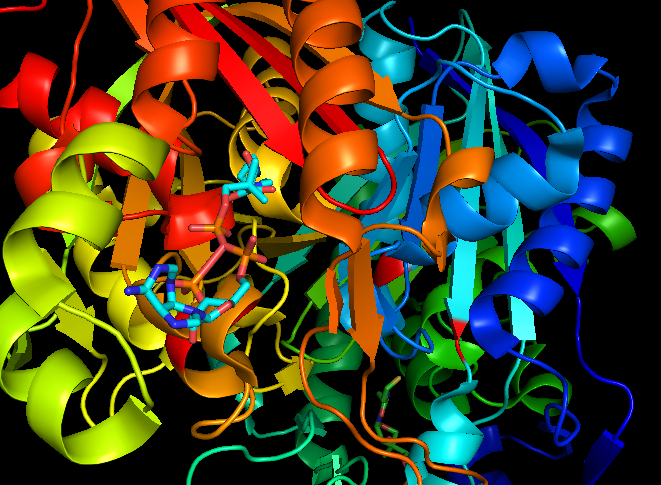
Proposed active site of beta-ketoacyl-ACP synthase III

Beta-ketoacyl-ACP synthases I and II only catalyze acyl-ACP reactions with malonyl ACP. Synthases I and II are capable of producing long-chain acyl-ACPs. Both are efficient up to acyl-ACPs with a 14 carbon chain, at which point synthase II is the more efficient choice for further carbon additions. Type I FAS catalyzes all the reactions necessary to create palmitic acid, which is a necessary function in animals for metabolic processes, one of which includes the formation of sphingosines.

Beta-ketoacyl-ACP synthase is found as a component of a number of enzymatic systems, including fatty acid synthetase (FAS); the multi-functional 6-methysalicylic acid synthase (MSAS) from Penicillium patulum, which is involved in the biosynthesis of a polyketide antibiotic; polyketide antibiotic synthase enzyme systems; Emericella nidulans multifunctional protein Wa, which is involved in the biosynthesis of conidial green pigment; Rhizobium nodulation protein nodE, which probably acts as a beta-ketoacyl synthase in the synthesis of the nodulation Nod factor fatty acyl chain; and yeast mitochondrial protein CEM1.

== Structure ==
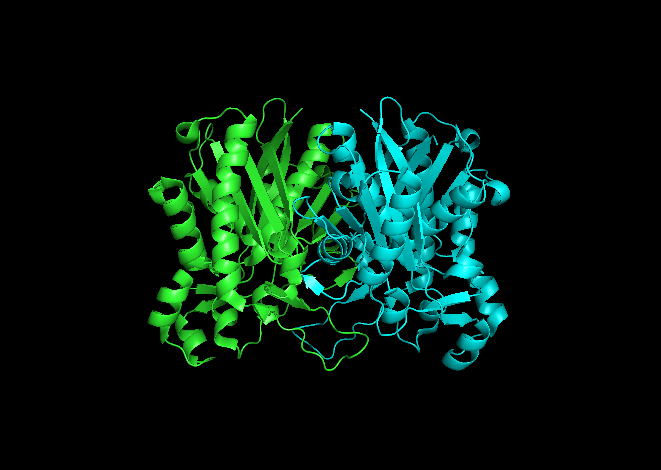
Crystal structure of Beta-ketoacyl-ACP synthase III from E.coli

Beta-ketoacyl synthase contains two protein domains. The active site is located between the N- and C-terminal domains. The N-terminal domain contains most of the structures involved in dimer formation and also the active site cysteine. Residues from both domains contribute to substrate binding and catalysis

In animals and in prokaryotes, beta-ketoacyl-ACP synthase is a domain on type I FAS, which is a large enzyme complex that has multiple domains to catalyze multiple different reactions. Analogously, beta-ketoacyl-ACP synthase in plants is found in type II FAS; note that synthases in plants have been documented to have a range of substrate specificities. The presence of similar ketoacyl synthases present in all living organisms point to a common ancestor. Further examination of beta-ketoacyl-ACP synthases I and II of E. coli revealed that both are homodimeric, but synthase II is slightly larger. However, even though they are both involved in fatty acid metabolism, they also have highly divergent primary structure. In synthase II, each subunit consists of a five-stranded beta pleated sheet surrounded by multiple alpha helices, shown in the image on the left. The active sites are relatively close, only about 25 angstroms apart, and consist of a mostly hydrophobic pocket. Certain experiments have also suggested the presence of "fatty acid transport tunnels" within the beta-ketoacyl-ACP synthase domain that lead to one of many "fatty acid cavities", which essentially acts as the active site.

== Mechanism ==
Beta-ketoacyl-synthase’s mechanism is a topic of debate among chemists. Many agree that Cys171 of the active site attacks acetyl ACP's carbonyl, and, like most enzymes, stabilizes the intermediate with other residues in the active site. ACP is subsequently eliminated, and it deprotonates His311 in the process. A thioester is then regenerated with the cysteine in the active site. Decarboxylation of a malonyl CoA that is also in the active site initially creates an enolate, which is stabilized by His311 and His345. The enolate tautomerizes to a carbanion that attacks the thioester of the acetyl-enzyme complex. Some sources speculate that an activated water molecule also resides in the active site as a means of hydrating the released CO_{2} or of attacking C3 of malonyl CoA. Another proposed mechanism considers the creation of a tetrahedral transition state. The driving force of the reaction comes from the decarboxylation of malonyl ACP; the energy captured in that bond technically comes from ATP, which is what is initially used to carboxylate acetyl CoA to malonyl CoA.

Beta ketoacyl synthase mechanism

== Biological function ==
The main function of beta-ketoacyl-ACP synthase is to produce fatty acids of various lengths for use by the organism. These uses include energy storage and creation of cell membranes. Fatty acids can also be used to synthesize prostaglandins, phospholipids, and vitamins, among many other things. Further, palmitic acid, which is created by the beta-ketoacyl-synthases on type I FAS, is used in a number of biological capacities. It is a precursor of both stearic and palmitoleic acids. Palmitoleic can subsequently be used to create a number of other fatty acids. Palmitic acid is also used to synthesize sphingosines, which play a role in cell membranes.

== Clinical significance ==
The different types of beta-ketoacyl-ACP synthases in type II FAS are called FabB, FabF, and FabH synthases. FabH catalyzes the quintessential ketoacyl synthase reaction with malonyl ACP and acetyl CoA. FabB and FabF catalyze other related reactions. Given that their function is necessary for proper biological function surrounding lipoprotein, phospholipid, and lipopolysaccharide synthesis, they have become a target in antibacterial drug development. In order to adapt to their environment, bacteria alter the phospholipid composition of their membranes. Inhibiting this pathway may thus be a leverage point in disrupting bacterial proliferation. By studying Yersinia pestis, which causes bubonic, pneumonic, and septicaemic plagues, researchers have shown that FabB, FabF, and FabH can theoretically all be inhibited by the same drug due to similarities in their binding sites. However, such a drug has not yet been developed. Cerulenin, a molecule that appears to inhibit by mimicking the "condensation transition state" can only inhibit B or F, but not H. Another molecule, thiolactomycin, which mimics malonyl ACP in the active site, can only inhibit FabB. Lastly, platensimycin also has possible antibiotic use due to its inhibition of FabF.

These types of drugs are highly relevant. For example, Y. pestis was the main agent in the Justinian Plague, Black Death, and the modern plague. Even within the last five years, China, Peru, and Madagascar all experienced an outbreak of infection by Y. pestis. If it is not treated within 24 hours, it normally results in death. Furthermore, there is worry that it can now be used as a possible biological warfare weapon.

Unfortunately, many drugs that target prokaryotic beta-ketoacyl-synthases carry many side effects. Given the similarities between prokaryotic ketoacyl synthases and mitochondrial ones, these types of drugs tend to unintentionally also act upon mitochondrial synthases, leading to many biological consequences for humans.

== Industrial applications ==
Recent efforts in bioengineering include engineering of FAS proteins, which includes beta-ketoacyl-ACP synthase domains, in order to favor the synthesis of branched carbon chains as a renewable energy source. Branched carbon chains contain more energy and can be used in colder temperatures because of their lower freezing point. Using E. coli as the organism of choice, engineers have replaced the endogenous FabH domain on FAS, which favors unbranched chains, with FabH versions that favor branching due to their high substrate specificity for branched acyl-ACPs.

== See also ==
- Beta-ketoacyl-ACP synthase I
- Beta-ketoacyl-ACP synthase II
- Beta-ketoacyl-ACP synthase III
- 3-oxoacyl-(acyl-carrier-protein) reductase
