= DEBS =

DEBS or D.E.B.S. may refer to:

- Double-entry bookkeeping system
- DEBS (6-deoxyerythronolide B synthase)
- D.E.B.S. (2003 film), a short film
- D.E.B.S. (2004 film), a feature-length film spawned by the short film of the same name
