= Anthocyanin 6"-O-malonyltransferase =

Identifiers
- EC no.: 2.3.1.171

Databases
- IntEnz: IntEnz view
- BRENDA: BRENDA entry
- ExPASy: NiceZyme view
- KEGG: KEGG entry
- MetaCyc: metabolic pathway
- PRIAM: profile
- PDB structures: RCSB PDB PDBe PDBsum
Search
- PMC: articles
- PubMed: articles
- NCBI: proteins

In enzymology, an anthocyanin 6"-O-malonyltransferase (EC 2.3.1.171) is an enzyme that catalyzes the chemical reaction

malonyl-CoA + an anthocyanidin 3-O-beta-D-glucoside $\rightleftharpoons$ CoA + an anthocyanidin 3-O-(6-O-malonyl-beta-D-glucoside)

Thus, the two substrates of this enzyme are malonyl-CoA and anthocyanidin 3-O-beta-D-glucoside, whereas its two products are CoA and anthocyanidin 3-O-(6-O-malonyl-beta-D-glucoside).

This enzyme belongs to the family of transferases, specifically those acyltransferases transferring groups other than aminoacyl groups. The systematic name of this enzyme class is malonyl-CoA:anthocyanidin-3-O-beta-D-glucoside 6"-O-malonyltransferase.
