= Malonyltransferase =

Malonyltransferase can refer to:

- (acyl-carrier-protein) S-malonyltransferase
- Anthocyanin 5-O-glucoside 6'''-O-malonyltransferase
- D-tryptophan N-malonyltransferase
