= Lovastatin nonaketide synthase =

lovastatin nonaketide synthase

Identifiers
- EC no.: 2.3.1.161
- CAS no.: 235426-97-8

Databases
- IntEnz: IntEnz view
- BRENDA: BRENDA entry
- ExPASy: NiceZyme view
- KEGG: KEGG entry
- MetaCyc: metabolic pathway
- PRIAM: profile
- PDB structures: RCSB PDB PDBe PDBsum
- Gene Ontology: AmiGO / QuickGO
Search
- PMC: articles
- PubMed: articles
- NCBI: proteins

In enzymology, lovastatin nonaketide synthase (EC 2.3.1.161) is an enzyme that catalyzes the chemical reaction

acetyl-CoA + 8 malonyl-CoA + 11 NADPH + 10 H^{+} + S-adenosyl-L-methionine $\rightleftharpoons$ dihydromonacolin L + 9 CoA + 8 CO_{2} + 11 NADP^{+} + S-adenosyl-L-homocysteine + 6 H_{2}O

The 5 substrates of this enzyme are acetyl-CoA, malonyl-CoA, NADPH, H^{+}, and S-adenosyl-L-methionine, whereas its 6 products are dihydromonacolin L, CoA, CO_{2}, NADP^{+}, S-adenosyl-L-homocysteine, and H_{2}O.

This enzyme belongs to the family of transferases, specifically those acyltransferases transferring groups other than aminoacyl groups. The systematic name of this enzyme class is acyl-CoA:malonyl-CoA C-acyltransferase (decarboxylating, oxoacyl- and enoyl-reducing, thioester-hydrolysing).
