= MCAT (gene) =

Protein-coding gene in the species Homo sapiens

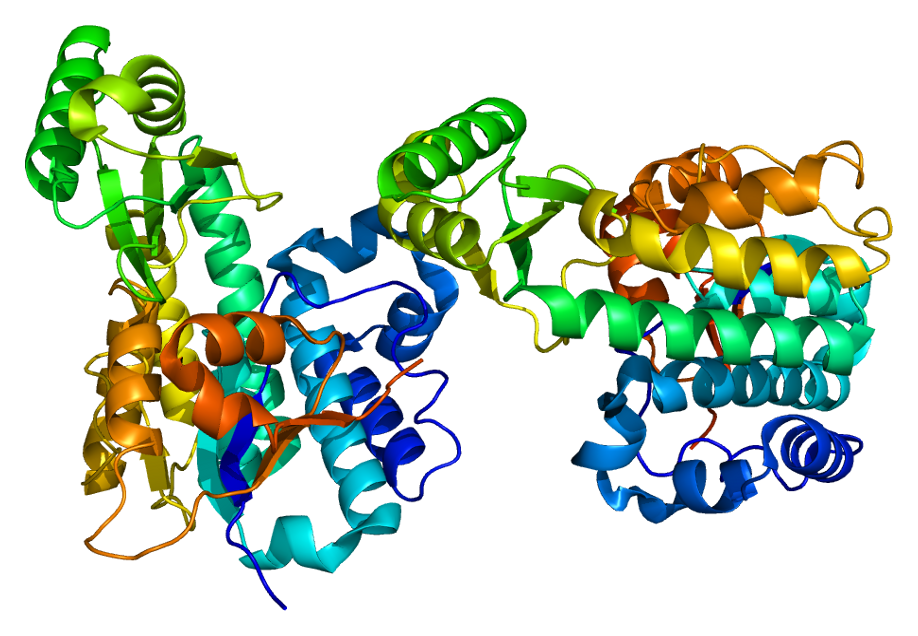
Available structures
PDB	Ortholog search: PDBe RCSB
PDB	List of PDB id codes 2C2N

Identifiers
- Aliases: MCAT, FASN2C, MCT, MT, NET62, fabD, malonyl-CoA-acyl carrier protein transacylase, MCT1
- External IDs: OMIM: 614479; MGI: 2388651; HomoloGene: 15511; GeneCards: MCAT; OMA:MCAT - orthologs

Gene location (Human)
Chr.	Chromosome 22 (human)
Band	22q13.2	Start	43,132,209 bp
Band	22q13.2	End	43,143,398 bp

Gene location (Mouse)
Chr.	Chromosome 15 (mouse)
Band	15|15 E1	Start	83,430,998 bp
Band	15|15 E1	End	83,447,988 bp
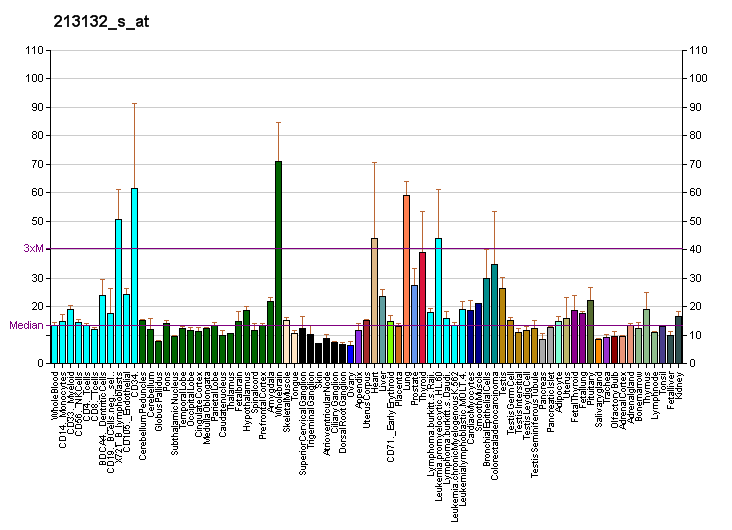
RNA expression pattern
Bgee	Human / Mouse (ortholog); Top expressed in: mucosa of transverse colon; right uterine tube; right adrenal gland; right adrenal cortex; epithelium of bronchus; left adrenal gland; prefrontal cortex; gonad; left adrenal cortex; bronchial epithelial cell / Top expressed in: spermatocyte; interventricular septum; right kidney; spermatid; seminiferous tubule; proximal tubule; right ventricle; muscle of thigh; left lobe of liver; ventricular zone; More reference expression data
BioGPS	More reference expression data
Gene ontology
Molecular function	transferase activity; catalytic activity; [acyl-carrier-protein S-malonyltransferase activity]; RNA binding; fatty acid synthase activity; S-malonyltransferase activity
Cellular component	mitochondrion; mitochondrial matrix
Biological process	metabolism; fatty acid biosynthetic process; fatty acid metabolic process; lipid metabolism; fatty acid beta-oxidation
Sources:Amigo / QuickGO
Orthologs
Species	Human	Mouse
Entrez	27349	223722
Ensembl	ENSG00000100294	ENSMUSG00000048755
UniProt	Q8IVS2	Q8R3F5
RefSeq (mRNA)	NM_014507; NM_173467	NM_001030014
RefSeq (protein)	NP_055322; NP_775738	NP_001025185
Location (UCSC)	Chr 22: 43.13 – 43.14 Mb	Chr 15: 83.43 – 83.45 Mb
PubMed search
- Wikidata
View/Edit Human	View/Edit Mouse

Malonyl CoA-acyl carrier protein transacylase, mitochondrial is an enzyme that in humans is encoded by the MCAT gene.

== Function ==
The protein encoded by this gene is found exclusively in the mitochondrion, where it catalyzes the transfer of a malonyl group from malonyl-CoA to the mitochondrial acyl carrier protein (mtACP). The encoded protein may be part of a fatty acid synthase complex that is more like the type II prokaryotic and plastid complexes rather than the type I human cytosolic complex. Two transcript variants encoding different isoforms have been found for this gene.

== Clinical significance ==
The enzyme encoded by the MCAT gene, along with other enzymes that regulate Malonyl-CoA concentration, have been shown to regulate levels such that malonyl-CoA concentration decreases in human muscle tissue when under exercise training. This enzyme specifically has increased activity under these conditions, as it is known to catabolize malonyl-CoA.

== Interactions ==
The human Malonyl CoA-acel carrier protein transacylase in human mitochondria associates with respiratory complex one, such that it interacts functionally with a mitochondrial malonyltransferase. Both species are encoded by nuclear genes, and their translocation into mitochondria is dependent on the presence of an N-terminal targeting sequence.
