= D-tryptophan N-malonyltransferase =

Identifiers
- EC no.: 2.3.1.112
- CAS no.: 94490-01-4

Databases
- IntEnz: IntEnz view
- BRENDA: BRENDA entry
- ExPASy: NiceZyme view
- KEGG: KEGG entry
- MetaCyc: metabolic pathway
- PRIAM: profile
- PDB structures: RCSB PDB PDBe PDBsum
- Gene Ontology: AmiGO / QuickGO
Search
- PMC: articles
- PubMed: articles
- NCBI: proteins

In enzymology, a D-tryptophan N-malonyltransferase (EC 2.3.1.112) is an enzyme that catalyzes the chemical reaction

malonyl-CoA + D-tryptophan $\rightleftharpoons$ CoA + N_{2}-malonyl-D-tryptophan

Thus, the two substrates of this enzyme are malonyl-CoA and D-tryptophan, whereas its two products are CoA and N2-malonyl-D-tryptophan.

This enzyme belongs to the family of transferases, specifically those acyltransferases transferring groups other than aminoacyl groups. The systematic name of this enzyme class is malonyl-CoA:D-tryptophan N-malonyltransferase.
