= Erythronolide synthase =

erythronolide synthase

Identifiers
- EC no.: 2.3.1.94
- CAS no.: 87683-77-0

Databases
- IntEnz: IntEnz view
- BRENDA: BRENDA entry
- ExPASy: NiceZyme view
- KEGG: KEGG entry
- MetaCyc: metabolic pathway
- PRIAM: profile
- PDB structures: RCSB PDB PDBe PDBsum
- Gene Ontology: AmiGO / QuickGO
Search
- PMC: articles
- PubMed: articles
- NCBI: proteins

In enzymology, an erythronolide synthase (also 6-Deoxyerythronolide B Synthase or DEBS) is an enzyme that catalyzes the chemical reaction

6 malonyl-CoA + propanoyl-CoA $\rightleftharpoons$ 7 CoA + 6-deoxyerythronolide B

Thus, the two substrates of this enzyme are malonyl-CoA and propanoyl-CoA, whereas its two products are CoA and 6-deoxyerythronolide b. This enzyme participates in biosynthesis of 12-, 14- and 16-membered macrolides.

This enzyme belongs to the family of transferases, it has been identified as part of a Type 1 polyketide synthase module. DEBS is found in Saccharopolyspora erythraea and other actinobacteria, and is responsible for the synthesis of the macrolide ring which is the precursor of the antibiotic erythromycin. There have been three categories of polyketide synthases identified to date, type 1, 2 and 3. Type one synthases involve large multidomain proteins containing all the sites necessary for polyketide synthesis. Type two synthases contain active sites distributed among several smaller polypeptides, and type three synthases are large multi-protein complexes containing modules which have a single active site for each and every step of polyketide synthesis. In the case of DEBS, there are three large multi-functional proteins, DEBS 1,2, and 3, that each exist as a dimer of two modules. Each module consists of a minimum of a Ketosynthase (KS), Acyl carrier protein (ACP) site, and acyltransferase (AT), but may also contain a Ketoreductase (KR), Dehydrotase (DH), and Enol Reductase (ER) for additional reduction reactions. The DEBS complex also contains a Loading Domain on module 1 consisting of an acyl carrier protein and an acyltransferase. The terminal Thioesterase acts solely to terminate DEBS polyketide synthesis and cyclize the macrolide ring.

== Module components and functions ==
=== Ketosynthase ===
The active site of this enzyme has a very broad specificity, which allows for the synthesis of long chains of carbon atoms by joining, via a thioester linkage, small organic acids, such as acetic and malonic acid. The KS domain receives the growing polyketide chain from the upstream module and subsequently catalyzes formation of the C-C bond between this substrate and an ACP-bound extender unit that is selected by the AT domain.

=== Acyltransferase ===
Each AT domain has an α-carboxylated CoA thioester (i.e. methylmalonyl-CoA) This specificity prevents non-essential addition of enzymes within the module. The AT captures a nucleophilic β-carboxyacyl-CoA extender unit and transfers it to the phosphopantetheine arm of the ACP domain.

Functions via catalyzing acyl transfer from methylmalonyl-CoA to the ACP domain within the same module via a covalent acyl-AT intermediate. The importance of the AT to the stringent incorporation of specific extender unit in the synthesis of polyketide building blocks makes it vital that the mechanism and structure of these domains be well-elucidated in order to develop efficient strategies for the regiospecific engineering of extender unit incorporation in polyketide biosynthesis.

=== Acyl Carrier Protein ===
The ACP is not substrate specific, which allows for the interaction with every domain present within its module. This protein collaborates with the ketosynthase (KS) domain of the same module to catalyze polyketide chain elongation, and subsequently engages with the KS domain of the next module to facilitate forward chain transfer. The ACP first accepts the extender unit from the AT, then collaborates with the KS domain in chain elongation, and finally anchors the newly elongated chain as it undergoes modification at the β-keto position. In order to carry out their function, the ACP domains require post-translational addition of a phosphopantetheine group to a conserved serine residue of the ACP. The terminal sulfhydryl group of the phosphopantetheine is the site of attachment of the growing polyketide chain.

=== Thioesterase ===
Located at the C-terminus site of the furthest downstream module. It is terminated in a thioesterase, which releases the mature polyketide (either as the free acid or a cyclized product), via lactonization.

Note: As stated above, the first module of DEBS contains an additional acyltransferase and ACP for initiation of the reactions

=== Non-essential components ===
Additional components, may have any one or a combination of the following:

Ketoreductase- Uses NADPH to stereospecifically reduce it to a hydroxyl group

Dehydratase- Catalyzes the removal of the hydroxyl group to create a double bond from organic compounds in the form of water

Enolreductase- Utilizes NADPH to reduce the double bond from the organic compound

== Comparison between fatty acid synthesis and polyketide synthesis ==
Fatty acid synthesis in most prokaryotes occurs by a type II synthase made of many enzymes located in the cytoplasm that can be separated. However, some bacteria such as Mycobacterium smegmatis as well as mammals and yeast use a type I synthase which is a large multifunctional protein similar to the synthase used for polyketide synthesis. This Type I synthase includes discrete domains on which individual reactions are catalyzed.

In both fatty acid synthesis and polyketide synthesis, the intermediates are covalently bound to ACP, or acyl carrier protein. However, in fatty acid synthesis the original molecules are Acyl-CoA or Malonyl-CoA but polyketide synthases can use multiple primers including acetyl-CoA, propionyl-CoA, isobutyryl-CoA, cyclohexanoyl-CoA, 3-amino-5-hydroxybenzoyl-CoA, or cinnamyl-CoA. In both fatty acid synthesis and polyketide synthesis these CoA carriers will be exchanged for ACP before they are incorporated into the growing molecule.

During the elongation steps of fatty acid synthesis, ketosynthase, ketoreductase, dehydratase, and enoylreductase are all used in sequence to create a saturated fatty acid then postsynthetic modification can be done to create an unsaturated or cyclo fatty acid. However, in polyketide synthesis these enzymes can be used in different combinations to create segments of polyketide that are saturated, unsaturated, or have a hydroxyl or carbonyl functional group. There are also enzymes used in both fatty acid synthesis and polyketide synthesis that can make modifications to the molecule after it has been synthesized.

As far as regulating the length of the molecule being synthesized, the specific mechanism by which fatty acid chain length remains unknown but it is expected that ACP-bound fatty acid chains of the correct length act as allosteric inhibitors of the fatty acid synthesis enzymes. In polyketide synthesis, the synthases are composed of modules in which the order of enzymatic reactions is defined by the structure of the protein complex. This means that once the molecule reaches the last reaction of the last module, the polyketide is released from the complex by a thioesterase enzyme. Therefore, regulation of fatty acid chain length is most likely due to allosteric regulation, and regulation of polyketide length is due to a specific enzyme within the polyketide synthase.

== Application ==
Since the late 1980s and early 1990s research on polyketide synthases (PKS), a number of strategies for the genetic modification of such PKS have been developed and elucidated. Such changes in PKS are of particular interest to the pharmaceutical industry as new compounds with antibiotic or other antimicrobial effects are commonly synthesized after changes to the structure of the PKS have been made. Engineering the PKS complex is a much more practical method than synthesizing each product via chemical reactions in vitro due to the cost of reagents and the number of reactions that must take place. Just to exemplify the potential rewards of synthesizing new and effective antimicrobials, in 1995, the worldwide sales of erythromycin and its derivatives exceeded 3.5 billion dollars. This portion will examine the modifications of structure in the DEBS PKS to create new products in regards to erythromycin derivatives as well as completely new polyketides generated by various means of engineering the modular complex.

There are five general methods in which DEBS is regularly modified:

- Deletion or inactivation of active sites and modules
- Substitution or addition of active sites and modules
- Precursor-directed biosynthesis
- KR replacement for altered stereospecificity
- Tailoring enzyme modifications

=== Deletion or inactivation of active sites and modules ===
The first reported instance of genetic engineering of DEBS came in 1991 from the Katz group who deleted the activity of the KR in module 5 of DEBS which produced a 5-keto macrolide instead of the usual 5-hydroxy macrolide. Since then, deletion or inactivation (often via introduction of point mutations) of many active sites to skip reduction and/or dehydration reactions have been created. Such modifications target the various KR, DH, ER active sites seen on different modules in DEBS. In fact, whole modules can be deleted in order to reduce the chain-length of the polyketides and alter the cycle of reduction/dehydration normally seen.

=== Substitution or addition of active sites and modules ===
In one of the first reorganizations of DEBS, a copy of the terminal TE was placed at the end of each module in separate trials, which as predicted resulted in the cleavage and release of the correspondingly shortened products. Following this, ever more complex methods were devised for the addition or substitution of single or multiple active sites to the DEBS complex.

The most common method of engineering DEBS as of 2005 is AT substitution, in which the native AT domain is replaced with an AT specific for a different primer or extender molecule. Under normal circumstances, DEBS has a “loading” or priming AT specific for predominantly propionyl-CoA while all six subsequent AT are specific for the extender molecule, methylmalonyl-CoA. The native AT of DEBS have all been successfully substituted with AT from other modular PKS such as the PKS that produces rapamycin; which replaces the methylmalonyl-CoA specific AT with malonyl-CoA AT and produces a non-methylated erythromycin derivative. This mode of engineering in particular shows the versatility that can be achieved as both the priming molecule and the extender molecule can be changed to produce many new products. In addition to the AT sites, any of the reductive/dehydrating enzyme active sites may be replaced with one or more additional reductive/dehydrating enzyme active sites. For example, in one study, the KR of module 2 of DEBS was replaced by a full set of reductive domains (DH, ER and KR) derived from module 1 of the rapamycin PKS as shown in Figure 2 FIGURE 2

There is at least one report of a whole module substitution, in which module 2 of DEBS was replaced with module 5 of the rapamycin PKS The activities of the two modules is identical, and the same erythromycin precursor (6-deoxyerythronolide B) was produced by the chimeric PKS; however, this shows the possibility of creating PKS with modules from two or even several different PKS in order to produce a multitude of new products. There is one problem with connecting heterologous modules though; there is recent evidence that the amino acid sequence between the ACP domain and the subsequent KS domain of downstream modules plays an important role in the transfer of the growing polyketide from one module to another. These regions have been labeled as “linkers” and although they have no direct catalytic role, any substitution of a linker region that is not structurally compatible with the wild-type PKS may cause poor yields of the expected product.

=== Precursor-directed biosynthesis ===
Using a semi-synthetic approach, a diketide intermediate may be added either in vitro or in vivo to a DEBS complex in which the activity of the first KS has been deleted. This means that the diketide will load onto the second KS (in module 2 of DEBS) and be processed all the way to the end as normal. It has been shown that this second KS is fairly nonspecific and a large variety of synthetic diketides can be accepted and subsequently fully elongated and released. However, it has also been seen that this KS is not highly tolerant of structural changes at the C2 and C3 positions, especially if the stereochemistry is altered. To date, this has been the most successful approach to making macrolides with potency equal to or greater than erythromycin.

=== Ketoreductase replacement to alter stereospecificity ===
In modular PKS, KR active sites catalyze stereospecific reduction of polyketides. Inversion of an alcohol stereocenter to the opposite stereoisomer is possible via replacement of a wild-type KR with a KR of the opposite specificity. This has rarely been done successfully, and only at the terminal KR of the DEBS complex. It has been theorized that changing the stereospecificity of a KR in an earlier module would also require the concurrent modification of all downstream KS.

Recent studies of the amino acid sequence of the two types of stereospecificity in KR have determined a perfect correlation with these residues and the predicted stereochemical outcome. This is particularly useful in situations where the gene sequence of a modular PKS is known but the final product structure has not yet been elucidated.

=== Tailoring enzyme modifications ===
Enzymes that act on the macrolide after it has been released and cyclized by DEBS are called tailoring enzymes. Many such enzymes are involved in the production of erythromycin from the final product of unmodified DEBS, 6-deoxyerythronolide B. Such classes of enzymes include mainly oxidoreductases and glycosyl transferases and are essential for the antibiotic activity of erythromycin.

Thus far, few attempts have been made to modify tailoring pathways, however, the enzymes which participate in such pathways are currently being characterized and are of great interest. Studies are facilitated by their respective genes being located adjacent to the PKS genes, and many are therefore readily identifiable. There is no doubt that in the future, alteration of tailoring enzymes could produce many new and effective antimicrobials.

== Structural studies ==
As of late 2007, 8 structures have been solved for this class of enzymes, with PDB accession codes 1KEZ, 1MO2, 1PZQ, 1PZR, 2HG4, 2JU1, 2JU2, and 2QO3.

Other names of this enzyme class is malonyl-CoA:propanoyl-CoA malonyltransferase (cyclizing). Other names in common use include erythronolide condensing enzyme, and malonyl-CoA:propionyl-CoA malonyltransferase (cyclizing).
