= (acyl-carrier-protein) S-malonyltransferase =

Class of enzymes

Malonyl-CoA:ACP Transacylase

Identifiers
- EC no.: 2.3.1.39
- CAS no.: 37257-17-3

Databases
- IntEnz: IntEnz view
- BRENDA: BRENDA entry
- ExPASy: NiceZyme view
- KEGG: KEGG entry
- MetaCyc: metabolic pathway
- PRIAM: profile
- PDB structures: RCSB PDB PDBe PDBsum
- Gene Ontology: AmiGO / QuickGO
Search
- PMC: articles
- PubMed: articles
- NCBI: proteins

In enzymology, a [acyl-carrier-protein] S-malonyltransferase (EC 2.3.1.39) is an enzyme that catalyzes the chemical reaction

malonyl-CoA + acyl carrier protein ⇌ CoA + malonyl-[acyl-carrier-protein]

Thus, the two substrates of this enzyme are malonyl-CoA and acyl carrier protein, whereas its two products are CoA and malonyl-acyl-carrier-protein. This enzyme belongs to the family of transferases, specifically those acyltransferases transferring groups other than aminoacyl groups. This enzyme participates in fatty acid biosynthesis.

== Nomenclature ==
The systematic name of this enzyme class is malonyl-CoA:[acyl-carrier-protein] S-malonyltransferase. Other names in common use include malonyl coenzyme A-acyl carrier protein transacylase,

- [acyl carrier protein]malonyltransferase,
- FabD,
- malonyl transacylase,
- malonyl transferase,
- malonyl-CoA-acyl carrier protein transacylase,
- malonyl-CoA:ACP transacylase,
- malonyl-CoA:AcpM transacylase,
- malonyl-CoA:acyl carrier protein transacylase,
- MAT, and
- MCAT.

== Structure ==
Crystal Structures of FabD from E.coli and Streptomyces coelicolor are known and provide great insight into the catalytic mechanism of FabD. In E.Coli, FabD primarily involved in FAS pathway. However, in Streptomyces coelicolor, FabD is involved in FAS and polyketide synthase pathways. In both cases, the structures and active sites are very similar.

The crystal structure of (acyl-carrier-protein) S-malonyltransferase (FabD) in E.Coli It is refined at 1.5A resolution to an R factor of 0.19l. The active site is shown in the form of a mesh grid.

The protein has an α/β type architecture, but the fold is unique. the active site inferred from the location of the catalytic Ser92 contains a typical nucleophilic elbow as observed in α/ β hydrolases. Serine 92 is hydrogen bonded to His 201 in a fashion similar to various serine hydrolases. however, instead of the carboxylic acid typically found in catalytic triads, the main chain carbonyl of Gln 250 serves as a hydrogen bond acceptor in an interaction with His 201. Two other residues, Arg-117 and Glu-11 are also located in the active site, but their function is not clear.

== Function ==
The fatty acid synthetic pathway is the principal route for the production of membrane phospholipid acyl chains in bacterial and plants. The reaction sequence is carried out by a series of individual soluble proteins that are each encoded by a discrete gene, and the pathway intermediates are shuttled between the enzymes. Malony-CoA:ACP Transacylase (FabD) is one such individual soluble protein and catalyzes the following reaction:

malonyl-CoA + acyl carrier protein ⇌ CoA + malonyl-[acyl-carrier-protein]

The transfer of malonate to acyl-carrier-protein (ACP) converts the acyl groups into thioester forms which are characteristic of acyl intermediates in fatty acid synthesis and which are strictly required for the condensation reactions catalyzed by β-ketoacyl-ACP synthetase.

=== Mechanism ===
Malonyl-CoA:ACP Transacylase uses a ping-pong kinetic mechanism with a bound malonyl ester as the acyl intermediate attached to a serine residue residing within a GHSLG pentapeptide. FabD first binds malonyl-CoA, the malonyl moiety is then transferred to the active siteSer 92, and CoA is released from the enzyme. ACP then binds and the malonyl moiety is transferred to the terminal sulfhydryl of the ACP prosthetic group. This reaction is readily reversible.

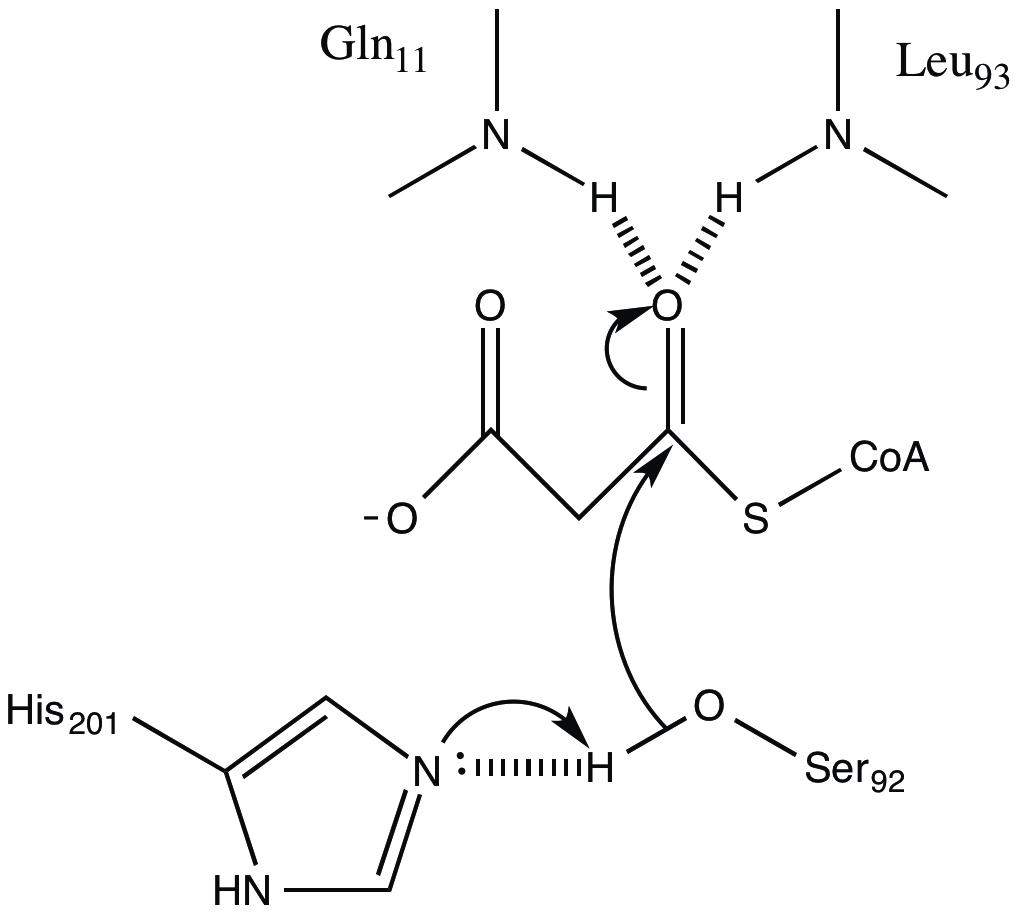
FabD reaction occurs via a ping-pong mechanism. In this first step, malonate is transferred from malonyl-coA to Ser 92 in the active site. His201 plays a role in activating Ser92 for nucleophilic attack on the incoming thioester. The CoA-SH functional group is then released from the enzyme and followed by ACP binding

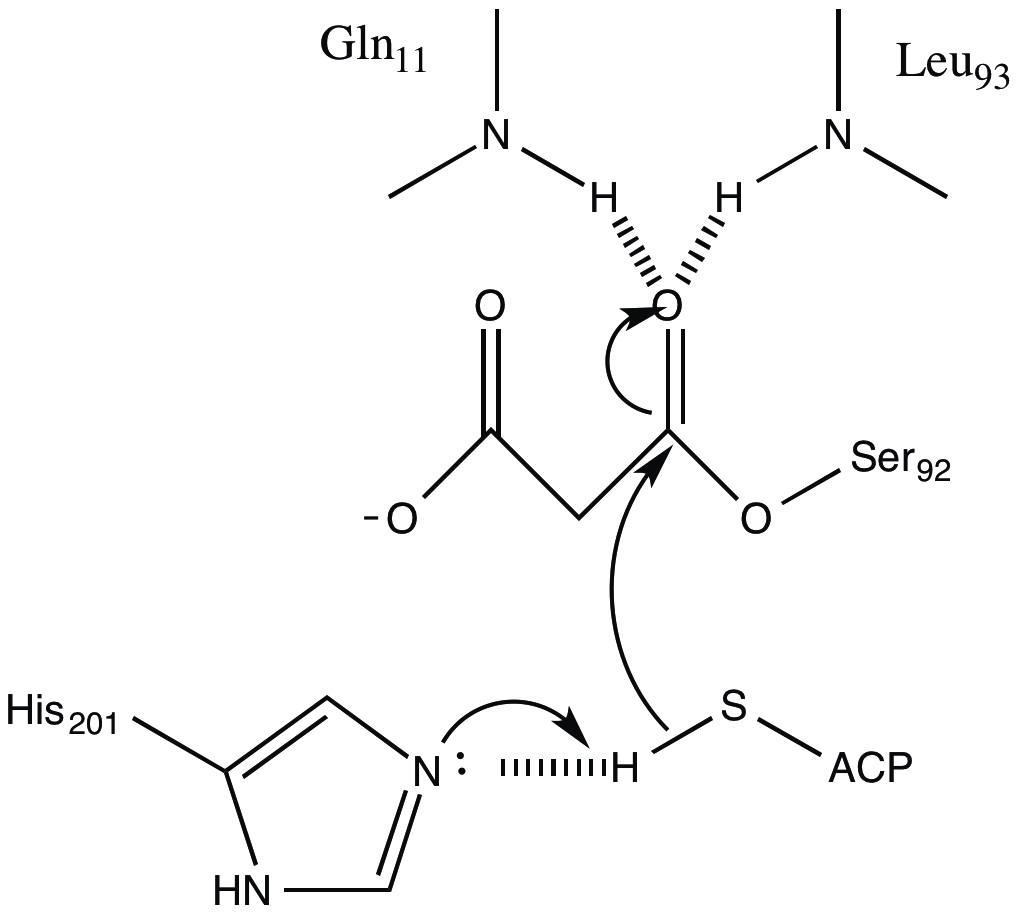
His201 activates the thiol of ACP for nucleophilic attack on the malonyl-Ser92 intermediate (generated in the previous step), promoting its transfer to the thiol of ACP

== Industrial relevance ==
Among all known metabolic pathways in living systems, fatty acid biosynthesis yields the most energy dense products. As a result, microbial fatty acid derivatives are emerging as a promising renewable energy alternative to fossil fuel derived transportation fuels. Recently, Khosla et al. have devised a procedure to reconstitute E.Coli Fatty Acid Synthase using purified protein components (including FabD) and reported a detailed kinetic analysis of this in-vitro reconstituted system. Their finding provide a new basis for assessing the scope and limitations of using E.Coli as a biocatalyst for the production of diesel fuels.

== Clinical relevance ==
=== FabD as a target for Antibacterial Drug Discovery: An upcoming field ===
Fatty acid biosynthesis is carried out by the ubiquitous Fatty Acid Synthase. Fatty acid synthase pathways are divided into two distinct molecular forms: Type I and Type II. In Type I, Fatty Acid Synthase (found in humans and other mammals) is a single large polypeptide composed of several distinct domains. On the other hand, each enzymatic activity (Condensation reaction, Reduction Reaction, Dehydration reaction) is found as a discrete protein in type II systems. The difference in active site organization and predominance of type II FAS systems in bacteria make the enzymes of this pathway attractive targets for antibacterials.

FabD (Acyl-Carrier-Protein S-Malonyltransferase) is a reasonable target given that a high resolution crystal structure is available. However, no FabD inhibitors have been reported in the literature and review articles on this topic. The simple structure and acidity of malonate seem to permit few approaches to synthesizing derivatives (acting as potential inhibitors) that retain the character of the molecule.

A second approach for using FabD as a drug target is frequently identified in the literature: FabD can provide a useful tag for locating fab genes because FabD gene is usually adjacent to at least one other fab gene. However (as of 2015), no potential drugs have attempted to exploit this feature.
