= Beta-ketoacyl-ACP synthase III =

Enzyme

β-ketoacyl-(acyl-carrier-protein) synthase III

Identifiers
- EC no.: 2.3.1.180
- CAS no.: 9077-10-5

Databases
- IntEnz: IntEnz view
- BRENDA: BRENDA entry
- ExPASy: NiceZyme view
- KEGG: KEGG entry
- MetaCyc: metabolic pathway
- PRIAM: profile
- PDB structures: RCSB PDB PDBe PDBsum
- Gene Ontology: AmiGO / QuickGO
Search
- PMC: articles
- PubMed: articles
- NCBI: proteins

3-Oxoacyl-[acyl-carrier-protein (ACP)] synthase III
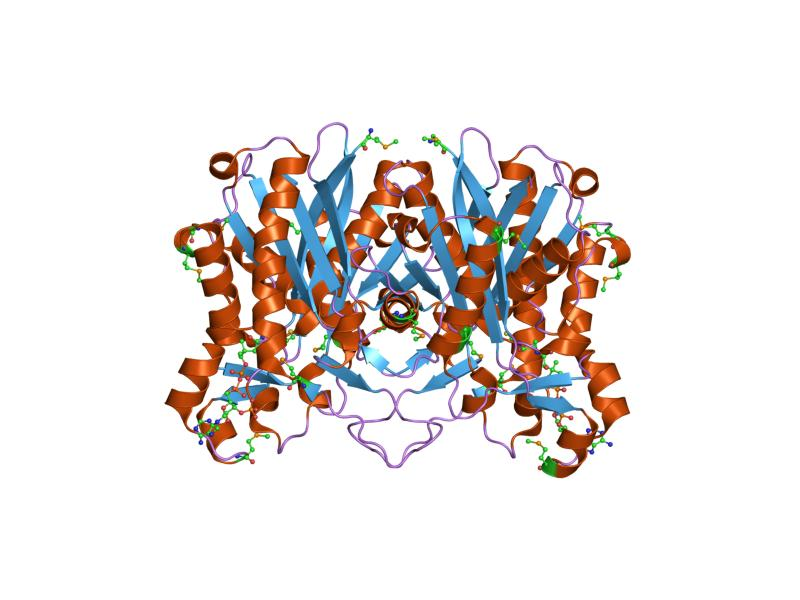
- Structure and active-site architecture of beta-ketoacyl-acyl carrier protein synthase III (FabH) from escherichia coli.

Identifiers
- Symbol: ACP_syn_III
- Pfam: PF08545
- InterPro: IPR013751
Available protein structures:
- Pfam: structures / ECOD
- PDB: RCSB PDB; PDBe; PDBj
- PDBsum: structure summary

In enzymology, a β-ketoacyl-[acyl-carrier-protein] synthase III (EC 2.3.1.180) is an enzyme that catalyzes the chemical reaction

acetyl-CoA + malonyl-[acyl carrier protein] $\rightleftharpoons$ acetoacetyl-[acyl carrier protein] + CoA + CO_{2}

Thus, the two substrates of this enzyme are acetyl-CoA and malonyl-[acyl-carrier-protein], whereas its 3 products are acetoacetyl-[acyl-carrier-protein], CoA, and CO_{2}. This enzyme belongs to the family of transferases, to be specific those acyltransferases transferring groups other than aminoacyl groups.

This enzyme participates in fatty acid biosynthesis. β-Ketoacyl-acyl-carrier-protein synthase III is involved in the dissociated (or type II) fatty-acid biosynthesis system that occurs in plants and bacteria. The role of FabH in fatty acid synthesis has been described in Streptomyces glaucescens, Streptococcus pneumoniae, and Streptomyces coelicolor.

== Nomenclature ==
The systematic name of this enzyme class is acetyl-CoA:malonyl-[acyl-carrier-protein] C-acyltransferase. Other names in common use include:

- 3-Oxoacyl:ACP synthase III
- 3-Ketoacyl-acyl carrier protein synthase III,
- KASIII
- KAS III
- FabH
- β-Ketoacyl-acyl carrier protein synthase III
- β-Ketoacyl-ACP synthase III
- β-Ketoacyl (acyl carrier protein) synthase III
- β-Ketoacyl-acyl-carrier-protein synthase III.

== Role in tuberculosis ==
Mycobacterium tuberculosis, the cause of tuberculosis, evades effective immune clearance through encapsulation, especially with mycolic acids that are particularly resistant to the normal degradative processes of macrophages. Furthermore, this capsule inhibits entry of antibiotics. The enzymes involved in mycolate biosynthesis are essential for survival and pathogenesis, and thus represent excellent drug targets.

In M. tuberculosis, the beta-ketoacyl-[acyl-carrier-protein] synthase III enzyme is designated mtFabH and is a crucial link between the fatty acid synthase-I and fatty acid synthase-II pathways producing mycolic acids. FAS-I is involved in the synthesis of C_{16} and C_{26} fatty acids. The C_{16} acyl-CoA product acts as a substrate for the synthesis of meromycolic acid by FAS-II, whereas the C_{26} fatty acid constitutes the alpha branch of the final mycolic acid. MtFabH has been proposed to be the link between FAS-I and FAS-II by converting C14-CoA generated by FAS-I to C_{16}-AcpM, which is channelled into the FAS-II cycle. According to in silico flux balance analyses, mtFabH is essential but not according to transposon site hybridization analysis. Unlike the enzymes in FAS-I, the enzymes of FAS-II, including mtFabH, and are not found in mammals, suggesting inhibitors of these enzymes are suitable choices for drug development.

== Structure and substrates ==
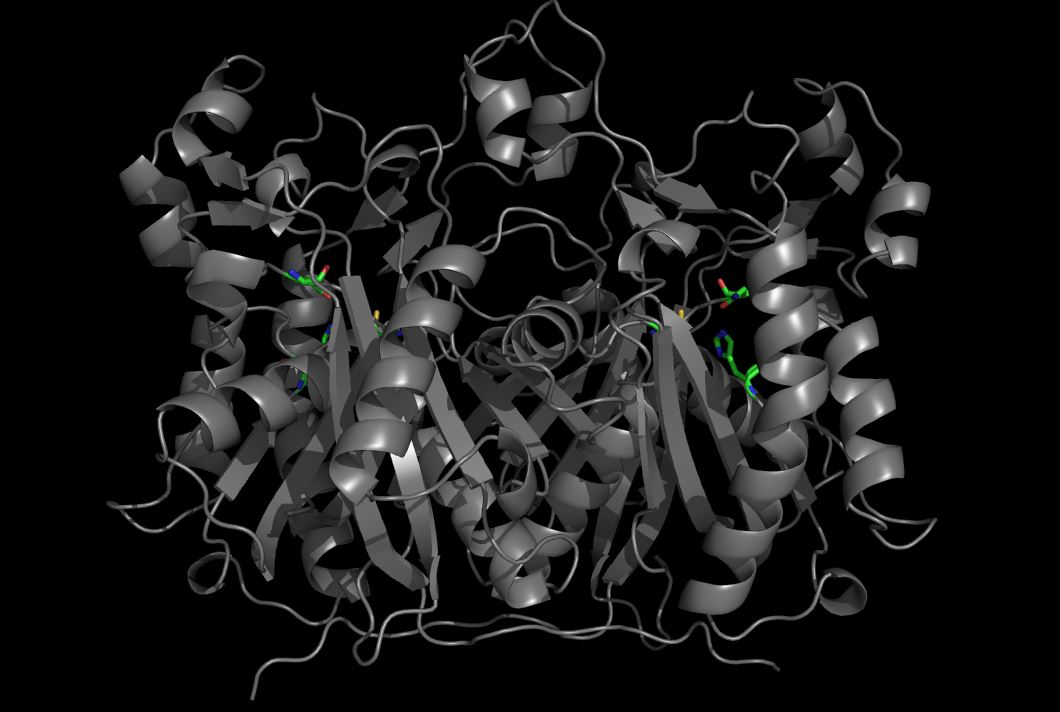
The structure of mtFabH. The enzyme is a homodimer of mixed α-helices and β-sheets, or a thiolase fold. The catalytic triads of C122, H258, and N289 are shown in colour and are largely buried in hydrophobic pockets.

Crystal structures of FabH have been reported from Mycobacterium tuberculosis, Staphylococcus aureus, Escherichia coli, and Thermus thermophilus.

The catalytic activity and substrate specificity of mtFabH has been measured then further probed using crystallographic and directed mutagenesis methods. Structures have been determined of ecFabH bound with substrates, (CoA, malonyl CoA, degraded CoA). Specific inhibitors developed using rational design have recently been reported. In 2005, the structure of a catalytically disabled mtFabH mutant with lauroyl-CoA was reported.

Native mtFabH is a homodimer with M_{r} = 77 ± 25 kDa. Although there is substantial structural homology among all bacterial FabH enzymes determined thus far, with two channels for binding of acyl-CoA and malonyl-ACP substrates and a conserved catalytic triad (C122, H258, N289 in mtFabH), mtFabH contains residues along the acyl-CoA binding channel that preferentially select for longer-chain substrates peaking with lauroyl-CoA (C_{12}). Inhibition strategies based on rational design could include competitive displacement of the substrates or disruption of the catalytic site. Phosphorylation of Thr^{45}, which is located at the entrance of the substrate channel, inhibits activity, perhaps by altering accessibility of substrates.

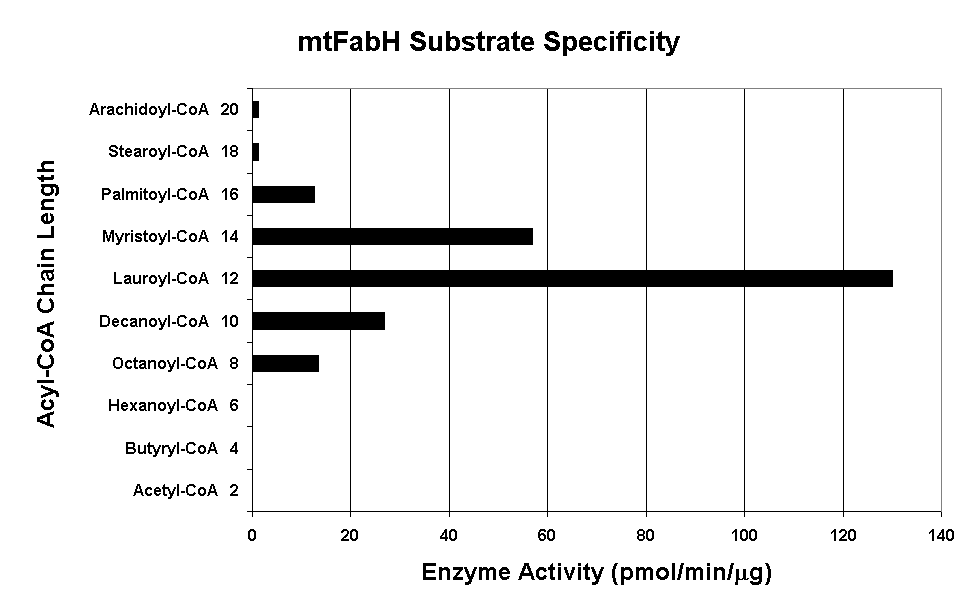
Substrate specificity of mtFabH in relation to acyl-CoA chain length. The optimum length is lauroyl-CoA, C_{12}.

== Inhibitors ==
At least two of the existing drugs for tuberculosis were originally derived from microbes; cerulenin from the fungus Cephalosporium caerulens and thiolactomycin (TLM) from the actinomycete Nocardia spp. Isoniazid (isonicotinic acid hydrazide), ethionamide, triclosan [5-chloro-2-(2,4-dichlorophenoxy)-phenol] and TLM are known to specifically inhibit mycolic acid biosynthesis. Derivatives of TLM and related compounds are being screened to improve efficacy.

While much has been learned from these structural studies and rational design is an excellent approach to develop novel inhibitors, alternative approaches such as bio-prospecting may reveal unexpected compounds such as an allosteric inhibitor discovered by Daines et al. This could be especially important given that phosphorylation of mycolate synthesis enzymes is suggested to be critical to regulation and kinase domains are known to have multiple control mechanisms remote from ligand binding and active sites.

Following the discovery that phomallenic acids isolated from a leaf litter fungus identified as Phoma sp. are inhibitors of the FabH/FabF. Wang et al. recently reported their discovery from the soil bacterium Streptomyces platensis of a novel natural inhibitor of FabH with in vivo activity called platencin. These were found by screening 250,000 extracts of soil bacteria and fungi, demonstrating the viability of bio-prospecting. While a potentially useful antibiotic in its own right, it has now been shown that platensimycin is not specifically active on mtFabH.

It is speculated that novel inhibitors will most likely be small molecules of relatively low polarity, considering that the catalytic sites of the mtFabH homodimer are hidden in relatively hydrophobic pockets and the need to traverse capsules of established bacilli. This is supported by the poor water solubility of an inhibitor to ecFabH. It is also hoped that, by being small molecules, their synthesis or biosynthesis will be simple and cheap, thereby enhancing affordability of subsequent drugs to developing countries. Techniques for screening efficacy of inhibitors are available.

== Therapeutic potential ==
In 2005, tuberculosis caused approximately 1.6 million deaths worldwide, 8.8 million people became sick, with 90% of these cases in developing countries, and an estimated one-third of the world's population has latent TB. Despite the availability of the BCG vaccine and multiple antibiotics, until 2005 TB resurged due to multidrug resistance, exacerbated by incubation in immune-compromised AIDS victims, drug treatment non-compliance, and ongoing systemic deficiencies of healthcare in developing countries. Mortality and infection rates appear to have peaked, but TB remains a serious global problem. New effective drugs are needed to combat this disease. Inhibitors against mtFabH, or against other enzymes of the FAS-II pathway, may have broader utility, such as the treatment of multidrug-resistant Staphylococcus aureus, and Plasmodium falciparum, the causative agent of another serious refractory problem, malaria.

Given the predominance of TB in poor countries, the commercial incentive to develop new drugs has been hampered, along with complacency and reliance on old, well-established, "first-line" drugs such as Rifampicin, Isoniazid, Pyrazinamide, and Ethambutol. The price point is already very low: US$16–35 will buy a full six-month drug course Nevertheless, new drugs are in clinical trials.

According to the Global Alliance for TB Drug Development, sales of first-line TB drugs are projected to be approximately US$315 million per year, and US$54 million for second-line treatments, yet the global economic toll of TB is at least $12 billion each year.
