= Beta-ketoacyl-ACP synthase II =

Beta-ketoacyl-acyl-carrier-protein synthase II

Identifiers
- EC no.: 2.3.1.179

Databases
- IntEnz: IntEnz view
- BRENDA: BRENDA entry
- ExPASy: NiceZyme view
- KEGG: KEGG entry
- MetaCyc: metabolic pathway
- PRIAM: profile
- PDB structures: RCSB PDB PDBe PDBsum
Search
- PMC: articles
- PubMed: articles
- NCBI: proteins

In enzymology, a beta-ketoacyl-acyl-carrier-protein synthase II (EC 2.3.1.179) is an enzyme that catalyzes the chemical reaction

(Z)-hexadec-11-enoyl-[acyl-carrier-protein] + malonyl-[acyl-carrier-protein] $\rightleftharpoons$ (Z)-3-oxooctadec-13-enoyl-[acyl-carrier-protein] + CO_{2} + [acyl-carrier-protein]

Thus, the two substrates of this enzyme are (Z)-hexadec-11-enoyl-[acyl-carrier-protein] and malonyl-[acyl-carrier-protein], whereas its 3 products are (Z)-3-oxooctadec-13-enoyl-[acyl-carrier-protein], CO_{2}, and acyl-carrier-protein.

This enzyme belongs to the family of transferases, specifically those acyltransferases transferring groups other than aminoacyl groups. The systematic name of this enzyme class is (Z)-hexadec-11-enoyl-[acyl-carrier-protein]:malonyl-[acyl-carrier-pr otein] C-acyltransferase (decarboxylating). Other names in common use include KASII, KAS II, FabF, 3-oxoacyl-acyl carrier protein synthase I, and beta-ketoacyl-ACP synthase II. This enzyme participates in fatty acid biosynthesis.
