= Malonyl-CoA =

Names
- Preferred IUPAC name (9R)-1-[(2R,3S,4R,5R)-5-(6-Amino-9H-purin-9-yl)-4-hydroxy-3-(phosphonooxy)oxolan-2-yl]-3,5,9-trihydroxy-3,5,10,14,19-pentaoxo-8,8-dimethyl-2,4,6-trioxa-18-thia-11,15-diaza-3λ^{5},5λ^{5}-diphosphahenicosan-21-oic acid

Identifiers
CAS Number	524-14-1 (free acid); 116928-84-8 (tetralithium salt)
ChemSpider	559121
ECHA InfoCard	100.007.596
MeSH	Malonyl+CoA
PubChem CID	644066
UNII	LNB9YCJ9F9 (free acid)
CompTox Dashboard (EPA)	DTXSID40904351
- InChI: InChI=1S/C24H38N7O19P3S/c1-24(2,19(37)22(38)27-4-3-13(32)26-5-6-54-15(35)7-14(33)34)9-47-53(44,45)50-52(42,43)46-8-12-18(49-51(39,40)41)17(36)23(48-12)31-11-30-16-20(25)28-10-29-21(16)31/h10-12,17-19,23,36-37H,3-9H2,1-2H3,(H,26,32)(H,27,38)(H,33,34)(H,42,43)(H,44,45)(H2,25,28,29)(H2,39,40,41)/t12-,17-,18-,19+,23-/m1/s1 Key: LTYOQGRJFJAKNA-DVVLENMVSA-N

Properties
Chemical formula	C_{24}H_{38}N_{7}O_{19}P_{3}S
Molar mass	853.582
- Except where otherwise noted, data are given for materials in their standard state (at 25 °C [77 °F], 100 kPa). verify (what is ?) Infobox references

Malonyl-CoA is a coenzyme A derivative of malonic acid.

== Biosynthesis ==
Malonyl-CoA cannot freely cross membranes and there is no known malonyl-CoA import mechanism. The biosynthesis therefore takes place locally:

- cytosol: Malonyl-CoA is formed by carboxylating acetyl-CoA using the highly regulated enzyme acetyl-CoA carboxylase 1 (ACC1). One molecule of acetyl-CoA joins with a molecule of bicarbonate, requiring energy rendered from ATP.
- Mitochondrial outer membrane: Malonyl-CoA is formed by carboxylating acetyl-CoA using the highly regulated enzyme acetyl-CoA carboxylase 2 (ACC2). The reaction is the same as with ACC1.
- mitochondrial matrix: Malonyl-CoA is formed in coordinated fashion by mtACC1, a mitochondrial isoform of ACC1, and acyl-CoA synthetase family member 3 (ACSF3), a mitochondrial malonyl-CoA synthetase. MtACC1, like cytosolic ACC1 catalyses the carboxylation of acetyl-CoA, while ACSF3 catalyses the thioesterification of malonate to coenzyme A. The latter serves for the clearance of mitochondrial malonate, since malonate is a potent inhibitor of mitochondrial respiration as it competitively inhibits succinate dehydrogenase. However, the source of malonyl-CoA in the mitochondria is still up for debate.

== Functions ==
It plays a key role in fatty acid biosynthesis and polyketide biosynthesis, fatty acid elongation, fatty acid oxidation via CPT1, the mTOR signaling pathway, and lysine malonylation.

=== Fatty acid synthesis and elongation ===
Cytosolic malonyl-CoA, derived from ACC1, serves as the two-carbon donor for cytosolic fatty acid synthesis by fatty acid synthase (FAS I), which is most active in lipogenic tissues such as the liver, adipose tissue, and the lactating mammary gland, and to a lesser extent in the kidney, brain and lung. The malonyl group from malonyl-CoA is transferred to the acyl carrier protein (ACP) domain of FAS I by its malonyl/acetyltransferase (MAT) domain, releasing CoA. The β-ketoacyl synthase (KS) domain then catalyzes condensation of malonyl-ACP with the KS-bound growing acyl chain, extending it by two carbons per cycle. In the liver and adipose tissue, fatty acid synthesis produces palmitate (C16:0), the precursor for membrane and storage lipids as well as for protein palmitoylation. In contrast, the human mammary gland mainly synthesizes medium chain fatty acids (MCFAs; C6–C12) for milk-fat production.

Cytosolic malonyl-CoA also provides the two-carbon donor for fatty acid elongation on the cytosolic side of the smooth endoplasmic reticulum (ER). The chemistry is analogous to cytosolic fatty acid synthesis but is carried out by four separate membrane-bound enzymes and uses CoA instead of ACP as the carrier. Fatty acids originating from cytosolic fatty acid synthesis or dietary uptake are first activated to acyl-CoAs by acyl-CoA synthetases and subsequently elongated by ELOVL enzymes through condensation with ACC1-derived malonyl-CoA, extending the acyl chain by two carbons per cycle. Depending on the specific ELOVL enzyme (ELOVL1–7) and its substrate specificity, fatty acid elongation produces distinct long-chain fatty acids (LCFAs; C12–C20) and very long chain fatty acids (VLCFAs; >C20) that serve as precursors of membrane phospholipids, sphingolipids, and signaling lipids. Highly expressed ELOVL enzymes are found in skin (ELOVL1), brain (ELOVL2), liver (ELOVL2, ELOVL6), brown adipose tissue (ELOVL3), retina (ELOVL4), testis and epididymis (ELOVL5), adipose tissue (ELOVL6), pancreas, kidney, prostate, and colon (ELOVL7).

Overview of the mitochondrial fatty acid synthesis (mtFAS) pathway, which uses malonyl-CoA as the two-carbon donor.

Mitochondrial malonyl-CoA serves as the two-carbon donor in mitochondrial fatty acid synthesis (mtFAS), similar to cytosolic fatty acid synthesis. This pathway, however, uses identical chemistry but relies on separate, monofunctional enzymes (FAS II) rather than a single multifunctional complex (FAS I). mtFAS is located in the mitochondrial matrix and is present in nearly all tissues, showing particularly high activity in energy-demanding tissues such as the heart, skeletal muscle, brain, and nervous system. In each cycle, malonyl-CoA:ACP transferase (MCAT) transfers the malonyl group from malonyl-CoA to mitochondrial acyl carrier protein (mtACP), and β-ketoacyl synthase (OXSM) condenses the resulting malonyl-mtACP with the mtACP-bound acyl chain, extending it by two carbons. Through successive cycles, this generates octanoyl-mtACP (C8:0), a precursor for protein lipoylation essential for the catalytic activity of mitochondrial multienzyme complexes including pyruvate dehydrogenase complex, α-ketoglutarate dehydrogenase complex, branched-chain α-keto acid dehydrogenase complex, the glycine cleavage system, and the 2-oxoadipate dehydrogenase complex. In addition, mtFAS produces longer acyl-mtACP species that allosterically activate a network of LYRM proteins required for iron–sulfur cluster biogenesis, assembly of electron transport chain complexes, and function of the electron-transfer flavoprotein.

=== Inhibitor ===
Beyond its biosynthetic role as a two-carbon donor in fatty acid synthesis and elongation, malonyl-CoA also serves as an inhibitor of enzymes:

Cytosolic malonyl-CoA, derived from ACC2, allosterically inhibits carnitine palmitoyltransferase I (CPT1), the rate-limiting enzyme on the outer mitochondrial membrane that catalyzes the association of long-chain fatty acids with carnitine, thereby preventing their transport into mitochondria. Within mitochondria, these fatty acids undergo β-oxidation to generate acetyl-CoA and the reducing equivalents NADH and FADH_{2}, providing a major energy source in oxidative tissues such as heart (~60%), skeletal muscle, and kidney, or supplying acetyl-CoA for ketone body synthesis in the liver during prolonged fasting. CPT1 sensitivity to malonyl-CoA varies by isoform and tissue, with CPT1B – predominant in oxidative tissues such as skeletal muscle and heart – showing greater sensitivity to malonyl-CoA inhibition than CPT1A, which is mainly expressed in liver and other lipogenic tissues. By inhibiting CPT1, malonyl-CoA prevents a futile cycle of simultaneous fatty acid synthesis and degradation.

Cytosolic malonyl-CoA also binds to the catalytic pocket of mTOR, acting as an ATP-competitive inhibitor that suppresses mTORC1 kinase activity. This interaction provides a metabolic feedback link between cytosolic fatty acid synthesis and mTORC1 signaling, allowing cells to coordinate their growth and biosynthetic activity with lipid availability.

=== Lysine malonylation ===
Protein with a malonylated lysine residue at physiological pH. The malonyl group (in red) originates from malonyl-CoA.

Malonyl-CoA serves as the donor for lysine malonylation, a reversible post-translational modification (PTM) that occurs particularly in mitochondria, but also in the cytosol and nucleus. It involves the covalent attachment of a malonyl group to the ε-amino group of lysine residues in proteins. This reverses the side chain’s charge from +1 to −1 and adds greater bulk, thereby altering protein structure, interactions, and function. Lysine malonylation depends directly on the availability of malonyl-CoA, thereby linking the metabolic state to protein regulation. Altered lysine malonylation is associated with angiogenesis, cancer, histone modification, immune regulation, obesity, osteoarthritis, and type 2 diabetes, among others.

=== Polyketide biosynthesis ===
MCAT is also involved in bacterial polyketide biosynthesis. The enzyme MCAT together with an acyl carrier protein (ACP), and a polyketide synthase (PKS) and chain-length factor heterodimer, constitutes the minimal PKS of type II polyketides.

== Clinical relevance ==
Malonyl-CoA serves as an intermediate in the mitochondrial clearance of toxic malonate, a potent inhibitor of succinate dehydrogenase (Complex II). Defects in the enzymes of this pathway cause the metabolic disorders combined malonic and methylmalonic aciduria (CMAMMA) and malonic aciduria. In CMAMMA (prevalence: 1: 30,000), the malonyl-CoA synthetase ACSF3 (encoded by ACSF3) is defective, impairing the ligation of malonate to CoA and leading to malonate accumulation and respiratory inhibition. Reported symptoms include neurological and metabolic manifestations such as seizures, cognitive decline, developmental delay, ketoacidosis, and hypoglycemia. In malonic aciduria (prevalence: <1: 1,000,000), malonyl-CoA decarboxylase (encoded by MLYCD) is defective, preventing decarboxylation of malonyl-CoA to acetyl-CoA, resulting in its accumulation and inhibition of fatty acid oxidation. Reported features include developmental delay, seizure disorders, hypoglycemia, and cardiomyopathy.

$\mathrm{Malonate + CoA + ATP\ \xrightarrow[ACSF3]{Malonyl{-}CoA\ Synthetase} \ Malonyl{-}CoA \ \xrightarrow[MLYCD]{Malonyl-CoA\ Decarboxylase} \ Acetyl{-}CoA }$
