= Sulfolobus metallicus =

Scientific classification
- Domain: Archaea
- Kingdom: Thermoproteati
- Phylum: Thermoproteota
- Class: Thermoprotei
- Order: Sulfolobales
- Family: Sulfolobaceae
- Genus: Sulfolobus
- Species: S. metallicus

Binomial name
- Sulfolobus metallicus Huber and Stetter 1992

Synonyms
- Sulfuracidifex metallicus (Huber & Stetter 1992) Itoh et al. 2020

Species of archaeon

Sulfolobus metallicus is a coccoid shaped thermophilic archaeon. It is a strict chemolithoautotroph gaining energy by oxidation of sulphur and sulphidic ores into sulfuric acid. Its type strain is Kra 23 (DSM 6482). It has many uses that take advantage of its ability to grow on metal media under acidic and hot environments.

== Taxonomy ==
The name "metallicus" is Latin meaning "the miner".

The use of biochemistry and phylogeny were originally the main source of classification, but 16S rRNA sequences were performed on it to elucidate the phylogeny. Sulfolobus sp. strain 7r sp. nov. is a close relative to Sulfolobus metallicus with comparable phylogenetic properties. Both Sulfolobus metallicus and Sulfolobus sp. strain 7r sp. nov. are grouped primarily based on their thermoacidophilic nature within the Thermoproteota archaeal phylum.

== History ==
Sulfolobus metallicus was first isolated in 1991 by doctors Gertrud Huber and Karl O. Stetter from solfataric fields in Iceland. The collected samples were grown on ore supplemented media under acidic conditions at the optimal temperature of 65°C. The archaea were routinely grown at the optimal temperature of 65°C on ore media. After Sulfolobus metallicus was shown to be able to oxidize sulfur compounds, researchers looked into its potential to oxidize reduced sulfur emissions.

== Metabolism ==
Sulfolobus metallicus was grown on media that contains reduced sulfur, and the production of sulfuric acid was tested. Sulfolobus metallicus was found to be a strict aerobic chemolithotroph because it oxidizes sulphur contained in minerals such as pyrite, chalcopyrite, elemental sulfur and sphalerite into sulfuric acid. Sulfolobus metallicus can also oxidize iron(II).

Sulfolobus metallicus has a unique type II NADH dehydrogenase with no iron-sulfur clusters that is covalently linked to a flavin molecule.

== Genetics ==
Sulfolobus metallicus's GC-content is around 38 mol%.

=== Genes of proteins ===
Though its whole genome has not been sequenced, the coding sequences of some genes have been sequenced:

==== Carboxylase genes ====
Genes were found in this organism that encode the biotin carboxylase, carboxyl transferase and biotin carboxyl carrier protein. These genes were discovered using Sanger sequencing. The amino acid residue sequence of all three proteins that are coded for by these genes have also been sequenced using microsequencing. Biotin carboxylase, carboxyl transferase and biotin carboxyl carrier protein could likely be a complex of proteins that help fix carbon dioxide for autotrophy.

==== fox genes ====
S. metallicus up-regulates genes that help it grow in environments with higher sulfur and iron concentrations. It has a cluster of genes, called fox genes, that encode membrane proteins that are similar to cytochrome c oxidase. The gene that codes for sulfur oxygenase-reductase was found to be expressed when the archaea was grown on sulfur media. cDNA of the fox genes that were known to be in other sulfur oxidizing cells were used to test the presence of the fox genes in Sulfolobus metallicus.

=== Phylogeny ===
The 16S rRNA DNA sequences are not always consistent with the phylogenetic analysis of the Sofolobales order of bacteria. However, a 16S rRNA analysis was performed on the members of Sulfolobales to make a phylogenetic tree. The closest member is the Sulfolobus strain LM, sharing 98.2% of the genome that codes for the 16S rRNA. Of the Sulfolobales, it is least related to Sulfolobus hakonensis with a 15.7% difference in the genes that code for the 16S rRNA. S. metallicus has an 87.7% similarity to S. hakonensis, an 87.6% similarity to A. brierleyi, an 87.4% similarity to M. sedula, an 87.5% similarity to M. prunae, 88.5% similarity to A. ambivalens and an 88.8% similarity to A. infernus.

== Physiology ==
Sulfolobus metallicus is a coccoid shaped archaea. Its cell envelope contains an S-layer, Isopranyl ether lipids and caldariellaquinone. The lipids protect the archaea from the acidic environments in which they live while still maintaining stability at high temperatures.

It has high levels of polyphosphate.

== Uses ==
=== Bioleaching ===
It is a key organism in bioleaching of copper, cobalt, nickel and gold. Bioleaching techniques can be used to separate metal sulfides into ionic metal, which can be collected, and hydrogen sulfide. The process requires both acidic protons and oxidized iron (Fe^{3+}). Sulfolobus metallicus, being an acidophile, can not only withstand the acidic conditions necessary for bioleaching, but also produces sulfuric acid that can be used for the bioleaching process and maintains the necessary levels of oxidized iron through its metabolism. Bioleaching at temperatures conducive of thermophiles like Sulfolobus metallicus has shown to be more effective than bioleaching with mesophiles. Bioleaching is adventitious to traditional metal extraction methods because it is more cost efficient and poses fewer hazards to the environment.

=== Oxidation of sulfur ===
Sulfolobus metallicus could potentially be utilized to eliminate reduced sulfur compounds, such as hydrogen sulphide (H_{2}S), near urban areas that cause disturbing odours. Many industries have H_{2}S gas emissions that present many environmental problems as well as a foul odour. S. metalllicus has shown that it can oxidize these compounds and potentially eliminate many of those emissions. Many of these industrial emissions occur at high temperatures and low concentrations. Sulfolobus metallicus has an advantage over other microbes for the task of sulfur oxidation in the fact that it is a thermophile, so it can be used to treat reduced sulfur at industrial temperatures that other sulfur oxidizers could not withstand.

=== Archaeal phospholipids ===
Sulfolobus metallicus could be used for mass-producing archeal phospholipids. These lipids have promising applications in drug delivery by acting as liposomes, or they can be used as lubricants but can be expensive to synthesize. Sulfolobus metallicus can potentially be used to provide a cheaper way to synthesize these lipids. If Sulfolobus metallicus is used as a bioleacher on the industrial scale, it grows in volume in tons per day. Researchers can centrifuge the solution and separate the lipid without interfering with the extraction of the metal.

=== Zinc binding domains ===
Sulfolobus metallicus is capable of synthesizing two isoforms of ferredoxin: FdA and FdB. The tertiary structure of ferredoxin is typically stabilized by electrostatic interactions with zinc ions (Zn^{2+}). In S. metallicus, FdA binds zinc ion, but FdB does not. Therefore, S. metallicus serves as a good model for studying how zinc binding affects the stability of proteins like ferredoxin.

== Growth and tolerance ==
Sulfolobus metallicus can grow between 50 °C and 75 °C (meaning it is a hyperthermophilic archaea) in acidic environments between pH 1.0 and 4.5. It can grow in 0-3% NaCl.

=== Polyphosphate ===
Sulfolobus metallicus can tolerate up to 200 mM copper sulfate. It was used as a model organism to study the mechanism of metal transport using polyphosphate because this archaea has a higher capacity to accumulate polyphosphate than other Sulfolobus archaea. It is proposed that the accumulation of high levels of polyphosphates contribute to the mechanism of the tolerance of these copper ions. Researchers put these archaea in an increased concentration of metal and found the exopolyphosphatase activity increased as polyphosphate levels decreased. This suggests that Sulfolobus archaea can tolerate metals through a polyphosphate mechanism.

== See also ==
- List of Archaea genera
