= Cilofexor =

Drug in clinical trials

Clinical data
- ATC code: None

Identifiers
- IUPAC name: 2-[3-[2-chloro-4-[ [ 5-cyclopropyl-3-(2,6-dichlorophenyl)-1,2-oxazol-4-yl]methoxy]phenyl]-3-hydroxyazetidin-1-yl]pyridine-4-carboxylic acid
- CAS Number: 1418274-28-8
- PubChem CID: 71228883
- IUPHAR/BPS: 10644
- DrugBank: 15168 DB 15168
- ChemSpider: 68007315
- UNII: YUN2306954
- ChEMBL: ChEMBL4297613

Chemical and physical data
- Formula: C_{28}H_{22}Cl_{3}N_{3}O_{5}
- Molar mass: 586.85 g·mol^{−1}
- 3D model (JSmol): Interactive image
- SMILES: C1CC1C2=C(C(=NO2)C3=C(C=CC=C3Cl)Cl)COC4=CC(=C(C=C4)C5(CN(C5)C6=NC=CC(=C6)C(=O)O)O)Cl
- InChI: InChI=InChI=1S/C28H22Cl3N3O5/c29-20-2-1-3-21(30)24(20)25-18(26(39-33-25)15-4-5-15)12-38-17-6-7-19(22(31)11-17)28(37)13-34(14-28)23-10-16(27(35)36)8-9-32-23/h1-3,6-11,15,37H,4-5,12-14H2,(H,35,36); Key:KZSKGLFYQAYZCO-UHFFFAOYSA-N

Cilofexor (also known as GS-9674) is a nonsteroidal farnesoid X receptor (FXR) agonist in clinical trials for the treatment of non-alcoholic fatty liver disease (NAFLD), non-alcoholic steatohepatitis (NASH), and primary sclerosing cholangitis (PSC). It is being investigated for use alone or in combination with firsocostat, selonsertib, or semaglutide. In rat models and human clinical trials of NASH it has been shown to reduce fibrosis and steatosis, and in human clinical trials of PSC it improved cholestasis and reduced markers of liver injury.

It is being developed by the pharmaceutical company Gilead Sciences.
