= Biotin attachment domain =

Biotin/lipoyl attachment domain

Identifiers
- Symbol: Biotin_lipoyl
- Pfam: PF00364
- InterPro: IPR000089
- PROSITE: PDOC00168
- SCOP2: 1lab / SCOPe / SUPFAM
- CDD: cd06663
Available protein structures:
- Pfam: structures / ECOD
- PDB: RCSB PDB; PDBe; PDBj
- PDBsum: structure summary
- PDB: 1dczA:55-122 1dd2A:55-122 1o78A:55-122 1k67B:81-155 2bdoA:81-155 1k69B:81-155 3bdoA:81-155 1bdo :81-155 1a6x :81-155 1y8pB:186-260 1y8nB:186-260 1fyc :186-260 1y8oB:186-260 1ghk :3-76 1ghj :3-76 1gjxA:4-76 1qjoA:207-278 1iyu :3-73 1iyv :3-73 1lac :3-76 1lab :3-76 1k8mA:65-138 1k8oA:65-138

Biotin/lipoyl attachment domain has a conserved lysine residue that binds biotin or lipoic acid. Biotin plays a catalytic role in some carboxyl transfer reactions and is covalently attached, via an amide bond, to a lysine residue in enzymes requiring this coenzyme. Lipoamide acyltransferases have an essential cofactor, lipoic acid, which is covalently bound via an amide linkage to a lysine group. The lipoic acid cofactor is found in a variety of proteins.

== Human proteins containing this domain ==
ACACA; ACACB; DBT; DLAT; DLST; DLSTP; MCCC1; PC; PCCA; PDHX;
