= Acetyl-CoA carboxylase =

Enzyme that regulates the metabolism of fatty acids

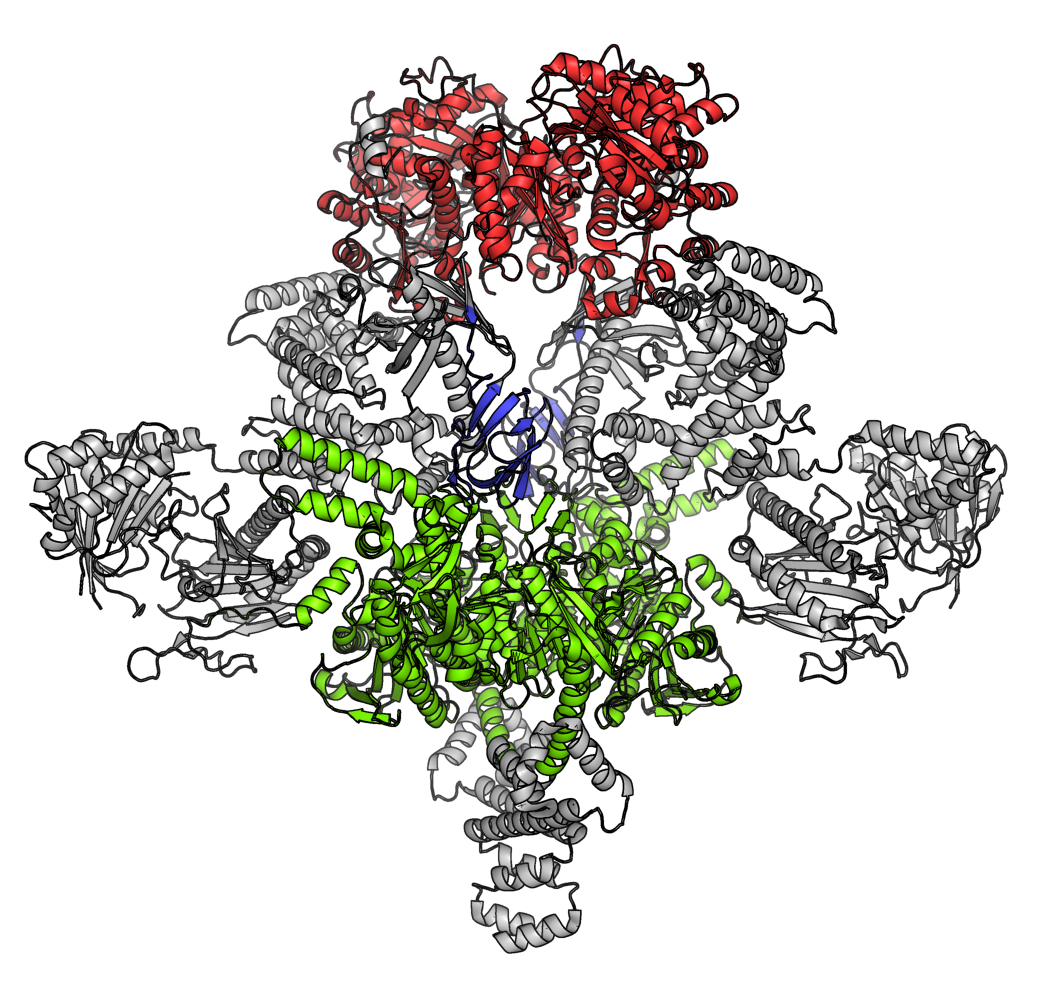
- Human ACC1 homodimer with catalytic domains highlighted; biotin carboxylase (red), biotinyl-binding (blue) and carboxyltransferase (green). PDB: 6G2D

Identifiers
- EC no.: 6.4.1.2
- CAS no.: 9023-93-2

Databases
- BRENDA: enzyme data
- ExPASy: NiceZyme view
- KEGG: enzyme entry
- MetaCyc: metabolic pathway
- Rhea: reactions
- PDB structures: RCSB PDB PDBe PDBsum
- Gene Ontology: AmiGO / QuickGO
Search
- PMC: articles
- PubMed: articles
- NCBI: proteins

Acetyl-CoA carboxylase alpha

Identifiers
- Symbol: ACACA
- Alt. symbols: ACAC, ACC1, ACCA
- NCBI gene: 31
- HGNC: 84
- OMIM: 601557
- RefSeq: NM_198839
- UniProt: Q13085

Other data
- EC number: 6.4.1.2
- Locus: Chr. 17 q21
Search for
- Structures: Swiss-model
- Domains: InterPro

Acetyl-CoA carboxylase beta

Identifiers
- Symbol: ACACB
- Alt. symbols: ACC2, ACCB
- NCBI gene: 32
- HGNC: 85
- OMIM: 200350
- RefSeq: NM_001093
- UniProt: O00763

Other data
- EC number: 6.4.1.2
- Locus: Chr. 12 q24.1
Search for
- Structures: Swiss-model
- Domains: InterPro

Acetyl-CoA carboxylase (ACC) is a biotin-dependent enzyme (EC 6.4.1.2) that catalyzes the irreversible carboxylation of acetyl-CoA to produce malonyl-CoA through its two catalytic activities, biotin carboxylase (BC) and carboxyltransferase (CT). ACC is a multi-subunit enzyme in most prokaryotes and in the chloroplasts of most plants and algae, whereas it is a large, multi-domain enzyme in the cytoplasm of most eukaryotes. The most important function of ACC is to provide the malonyl-CoA substrate for the biosynthesis of fatty acids. The activity of ACC can be controlled at the transcriptional level as well as by small molecule modulators and covalent modification. The human genome contains the genes for two different ACCs—ACACA and ACACB.

== Structure ==
Prokaryotes and plants have multi-subunit ACCs composed of several polypeptides. Biotin carboxylase (BC) activity, biotin carboxyl carrier protein (BCCP), and carboxyl transferase (CT) activity are each contained on a different subunit. The stoichiometry of these subunits in the ACC holoenzyme differs amongst organisms. Humans and most eukaryotes have evolved an ACC with CT and BC catalytic domains and BCCP domains on a single polypeptide. Most plants also have this homomeric form in cytosol. ACC functional regions, starting from the N-terminus to C-terminus are the biotin carboxylase (BC), biotin binding (BB), carboxyl transferase (CT), and ATP-binding (AB). AB lies within BC. Biotin is covalently attached through an amide bond to the long side chain of a lysine reside in BB. As BB is between BC and CT regions, biotin can easily translocate to both of the active sites where it is required.

In mammals where two isoforms of ACC are expressed, the main structural difference between these isoforms is the extended ACC2 N-terminus containing a mitochondrial targeting sequence.

Crystallographic structures of E. coli acetyl-CoA carboxylase
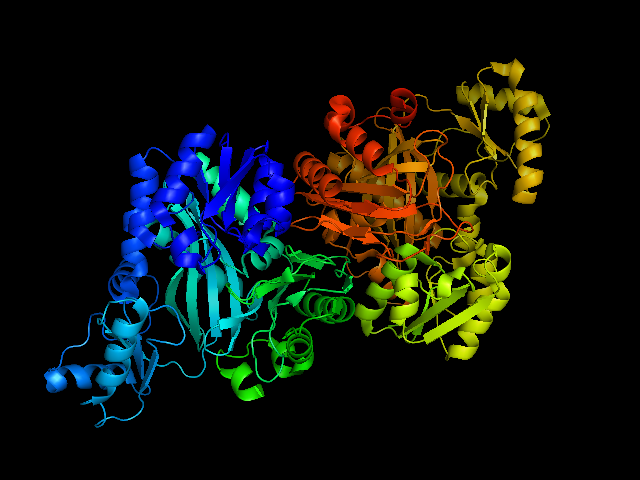
Biotin carboxylase subunit of E. coli acetyl-CoA carboxylase

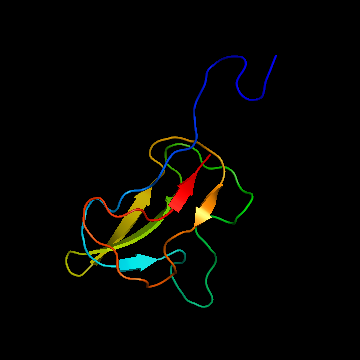
Biotin carboxyl carrier protein subunit of E. coli acetyl-CoA carboxylase

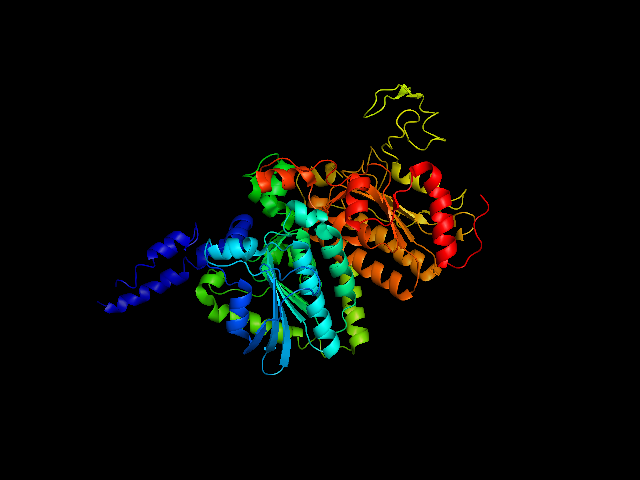
Carboxyl transferase subunit of E. coli acetyl-CoA carboxylase

== Genes ==
The polypeptides composing the multi-subunit ACCs of prokaryotes and plants are encoded by distinct genes. In Escherichia coli, accA encodes the alpha subunit of the acetyl-CoA carboxylase, and accD encodes its beta subunit.

== Mechanism ==
The overall reaction of ACAC(A,B) proceeds by a two-step mechanism. The first reaction is carried out by BC and involves the ATP-dependent carboxylation of biotin with bicarbonate serving as the source of CO_{2}. The carboxyl group is transferred from biotin to acetyl-CoA to form malonyl-CoA in the second reaction, which is catalyzed by CT.

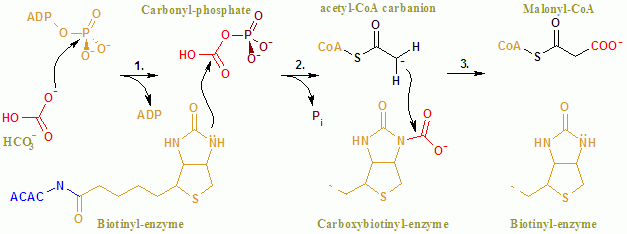
The reaction mechanism of ACAC(A,B). enzyme coenzymes substrate names metal ions phosphate carbonate

In the active site, the reaction proceeds with extensive interaction of the residues Glu296 and positively charged Arg338 and Arg292 with the substrates. Two Mg^{2+} are coordinated by the phosphate groups on the ATP, and are required for ATP binding to the enzyme. Bicarbonate is deprotonated by Glu296, although in solution, this proton transfer is unlikely as the pK_{a} of bicarbonate is 10.3. The enzyme apparently manipulates the pKa to facilitate the deprotonation of bicarbonate. The pK_{a} of bicarbonate is decreased by its interaction with positively charged side chains of Arg338 and Arg292. Furthermore, Glu296 interacts with the side chain of Glu211, an interaction that has been shown to cause an increase in the apparent pKa. Following deprotonation of bicarbonate, the oxygen of the bicarbonate acts as a nucleophile and attacks the gamma phosphate on ATP. The carboxyphosphate intermediate quickly decomposes to CO_{2} and PO^{3−}_{4}. The PO^{3−}_{4} deprotonates biotin, creating an enolate, stabilized by Arg338, that subsequently attacks CO_{2} resulting in the production of carboxybiotin. The carboxybiotin translocates to the carboxyl transferase (CT) active site, where the carboxyl group is transferred to acetyl-CoA. In contrast to the BC domain, little is known about the reaction mechanism of CT. A proposed mechanism is the release of CO_{2} from biotin, which subsequently abstracts a proton from the methyl group from acetyl-CoA carboxylase. The resulting enolate attacks CO_{2} to form malonyl-CoA. In a competing mechanism, proton abstraction is concerted with the attack of acetyl-CoA.

== Function ==
The function of ACC is to regulate the metabolism of fatty acids. When the enzyme is active, the product, malonyl-CoA, is produced which is a building block for new fatty acids and can inhibit the transfer of the fatty acyl group from acyl-CoA to carnitine with carnitine acyltransferase, which inhibits the beta-oxidation of fatty acids in the mitochondria.

In mammals, two main isoforms of ACC are expressed, ACC1 and ACC2, which differ in both tissue distribution and function. ACC1 is found in the cytoplasm of all cells but is enriched in lipogenic tissue, such as adipose tissue and lactating mammary glands, where fatty acid synthesis is important. In oxidative tissues, such as the skeletal muscle and the heart, the ratio of ACC2 expressed is higher. ACC1 and ACC2 are both highly expressed in the liver where both fatty acid oxidation and synthesis are important. The differences in tissue distribution indicate that ACC1 maintains regulation of fatty acid synthesis whereas ACC2 mainly regulates fatty acid oxidation (beta oxidation).

A mitochondrial isoform of ACC1 (mtACC1) plays a partially redundant role in lipoic acid synthesis and thus in protein lipoylation by providing malonyl-CoA for mitochondrial fatty acid synthesis (mtFAS) in tandem with ACSF3.

== Regulation ==
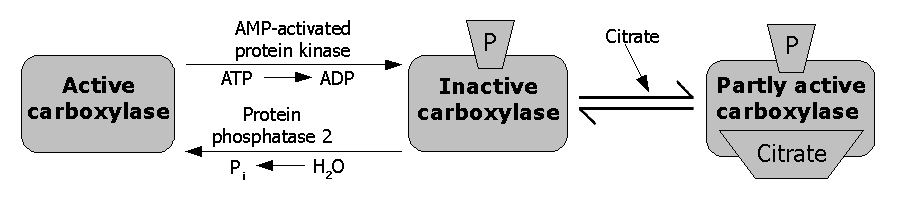
Control of Acetyl-CoA Carboxylase. The AMP regulated kinase triggers the phosphorylation of the enzyme (thus inactivating it) and the phosphatase enzyme removes the phosphate group.

The regulation of mammalian ACC is complex, in order to control two distinct pools of malonyl-CoA that direct either the inhibition of beta oxidation or the activation of lipid biosynthesis.

Mammalian ACC1 and ACC2 are regulated transcriptionally by multiple promoters which mediate ACC abundance in response to the cells nutritional status. Activation of gene expression through different promoters results in alternative splicing; however, the physiological significance of specific ACC isozymes remains unclear. The sensitivity to nutritional status results from the control of these promoters by transcription factors such as sterol regulatory element-binding protein 1, controlled by insulin at the transcriptional level, and ChREBP, which increases in expression with high carbohydrates diets.

Through a feed-forward loop, citrate allosterically activates ACC. Citrate may increase ACC polymerization to increase enzymatic activity; however, it is unclear if polymerization is citrate's main mechanism of increasing ACC activity or if polymerization is an artifact of in vitro experiments. Other allosteric activators include glutamate and other dicarboxylic acids. Long and short chain fatty acyl-CoAs are negative feedback inhibitors of ACC. One such negative allosteric modulator is palmitoyl-CoA.

Phosphorylation can result when the hormones glucagon or epinephrine bind to cell surface receptors, but the main cause of phosphorylation is due to a rise in AMP levels when the energy status of the cell is low, leading to the activation of the AMP-activated protein kinase (AMPK). AMPK is the main kinase regulator of ACC, able to phosphorylate a number of serine residues on both isoforms of ACC. On ACC1, AMPK phosphorylates Ser79, Ser1200, and Ser1215. Protein kinase A also has the ability to phosphorylate ACC, with a much greater ability to phosphorylate ACC2 than ACC1. Ser80 and Ser1263 on ACC1 may also serve as a site of phosphorylation as a regulatory mechanism. However, the physiological significance of protein kinase A in the regulation of ACC is currently unknown. Researchers hypothesize there are other ACC kinases important to its regulation as there are many other possible phosphorylation sites on ACC.

When insulin binds to its receptors on the cellular membrane, it activates a phosphatase enzyme called protein phosphatase 2A (PP2A) to dephosphorylate the enzyme; thereby removing the inhibitory effect. Furthermore, insulin induces a phosphodiesterase that lowers the level of cAMP in the cell, thus inhibiting PKA, and also inhibits AMPK directly.

This protein may use the morpheein model of allosteric regulation.

== Clinical implications ==
At the juncture of lipid synthesis and oxidation pathways, ACC presents many clinical possibilities for the production of novel antibiotics and the development of new therapies for diabetes, obesity, and other manifestations of metabolic syndrome. Researchers aim to take advantage of structural differences between bacterial and human ACCs to create antibiotics specific to the bacterial ACC, in efforts to minimize side effects to patients. Promising results for the usefulness of an ACC inhibitor include the finding that mice with no expression of ACC2 have continuous fatty acid oxidation, reduced body fat mass, and reduced body weight despite an increase in food consumption. These mice are also protected from diabetes. A lack of ACC1 in mutant mice is lethal already at the embryonic stage. However, it is unknown whether drugs targeting ACCs in humans must be specific for ACC2.

Firsocostat (formerly GS-976, ND-630, NDI-010976) is a potent allosteric ACC inhibitor, acting at the BC domain of ACC. Firsocostat is under development in 2019 (Phase II) by the pharmaceutical company Gilead as part of a combination treatment for non-alcoholic steatohepatitis (NASH), believed to be an increasing cause of liver failure.

In addition, plant-selective ACC inhibitors are in widespread use as herbicides, which suggests clinical application against Apicomplexa parasites that rely on a plant-derived ACC isoform, including malaria.

ACC inhibitors in IRAC group 23 are used as insecticides / acaricides.

The heterogeneous clinical phenotypes of the metabolic disease combined malonic and methylmalonic aciduria (CMAMMA) due to ACSF3 deficiency are thought to result from partial compensation of a mitochondrial isoform of ACC1 (mtACC1) for deficient ACSF3 in mitochondrial fatty acid synthesis (mtFAS).

== See also ==
- ACCase inhibitor herbicides
- Malonyl-CoA decarboxylase
