= Biotin carboxylase =

Class of enzymes

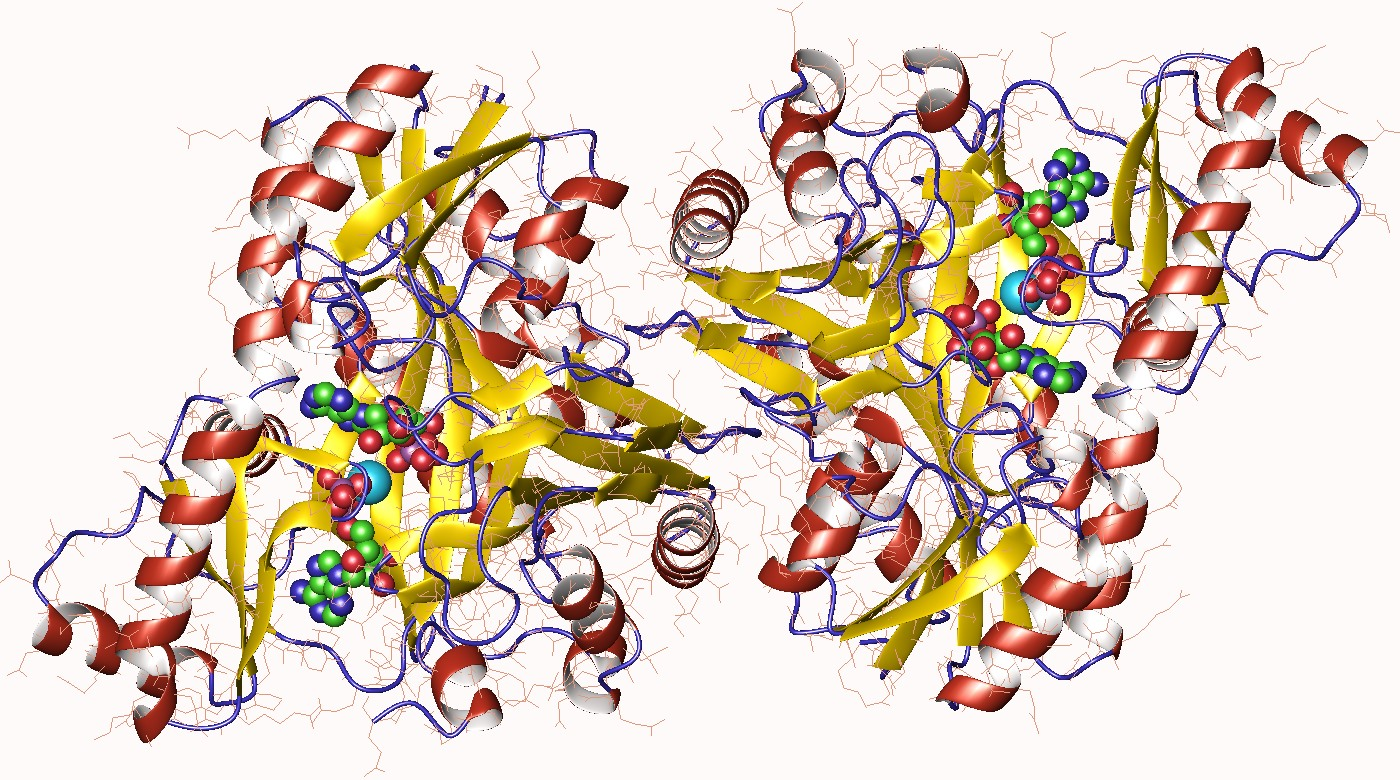
- Biotin carboxylase homodimer, E.Coli

Identifiers
- EC no.: 6.3.4.14
- CAS no.: 9075-71-2

Databases
- BRENDA: enzyme data
- ExPASy: NiceZyme view
- KEGG: enzyme entry
- MetaCyc: metabolic pathway
- Rhea: reactions
- PDB structures: RCSB PDB PDBe PDBsum
- Gene Ontology: AmiGO / QuickGO
Search
- PMC: articles
- PubMed: articles
- NCBI: proteins

Biotin carboxylase C-terminal domain
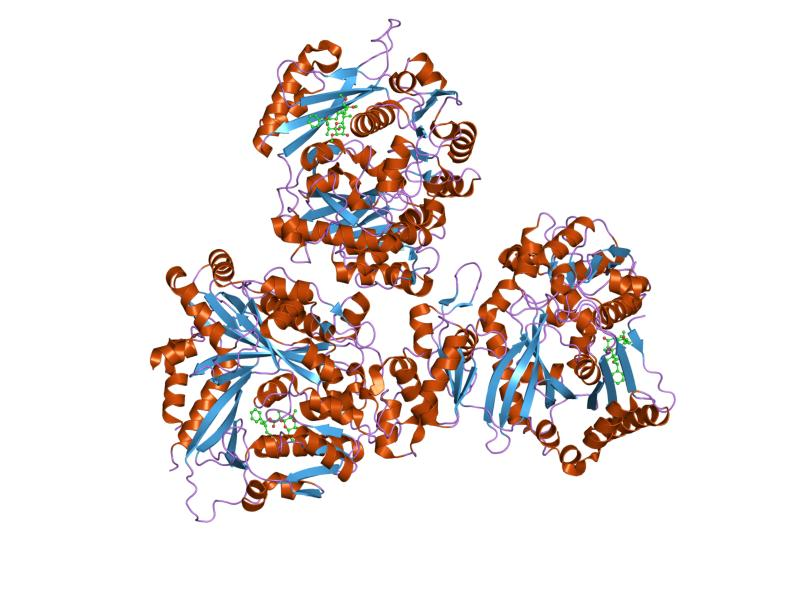
- crystal structure of biotin carboxylase domain of acetyl-coenzyme a carboxylase from saccharomyces cerevisiae in complex with soraphen a

Identifiers
- Symbol: Biotin_carb_C
- Pfam: PF02785
- InterPro: IPR005482
- SCOP2: 1dv1 / SCOPe / SUPFAM
Available protein structures:
- PDB: IPR005482 PF02785 (ECOD; PDBsum)
- AlphaFold: IPR005482; PF02785

In enzymology, a biotin carboxylase (EC 6.3.4.14) is an enzyme that catalyzes the chemical reaction

ATP + biotin-carboxyl-carrier protein + CO_{2} $\rightleftharpoons$ ADP + phosphate + carboxybiotin-carboxyl-carrier protein

The three substrates of this enzyme are ATP, biotin-carboxyl-carrier protein (BCCP), and CO_{2}, whereas its three products are ADP, phosphate, and carboxybiotin-carboxyl-carrier protein.

The systematic name of this enzyme class is biotin-carboxyl-carrier-protein:carbon-dioxide ligase (ADP-forming). This enzyme is also called biotin carboxylase (component of acetyl CoA carboxylase). This ATP-grasp enzyme participates in fatty acid biosynthesis. This enzyme participates in fatty acid biosynthesis by providing one of the catalytic functions of the Acetyl-CoA carboxylase complex. As previously mentioned, after the carboxybiotin product is formed, the carboxyltransferase unit of the complex will transfer the activated carboxy group from BCCP to Acetyl-CoA, forming a malonate analog known as malonyl-CoA. Malonyl-CoA serves as the primary carbon donor in fatty acid biosynthesis, followed by a series of reduction and dehydration reactions to remove the acyl group.

== Reaction pathway ==
Biotin carboxylases are a conserved enzyme present within biotin-dependent carboxylase complexes such as acetyl-CoA carboxylase. How biotin carboxylase functions is, within the relevant carboxylase complex, there is a biotin carboxyl-carrier protein which is covalently linked to biotin via a Lys-residue. Both biotin carboxylase activity as well as the BCCP within the carboxylase complex are highly conserved among this enzyme class. The main source of variation for carboxylases arises from the carboxyltransferase component, as the molecule to which the carboxyl group is transferred (from biotin) dictates the necessary specificity component to catalyze this transfer.

The structure of biotin carboxylase heavily influences the reaction pathway the enzyme catalyzes, so discussion of this reaction pathway must also touch on how the substrates and intermediates are stabilized within the active site. Bicarbonate (HCO_{3}^{−}) is held within the active site of biotin carboxylase by hydrogen bonding with biotin as well as a bidentate ion pair interaction of the negatively charged oxygen's with Arg_{292} iminium ion. It is hypothesized that the Glu_{296} residue of B.C. acts as a base, deprotonating bicarbonate molecule, thus facilitating nucleophilic attack of the carbonyl-oxygen on the terminal phosphate molecule of ATP. This initial reaction of the pathway can happen because the ATP is also held tightly within the active site pocket via non-covalent coordination of ATP with magnesium ions.

After this nucleophilic attack, the carbonate molecule is degraded to CO_{2} via electron pushing, producing a PO_{4}^{3-} ion which then acts as a base and deprotonates the amide of the ureido ring within biotin. An enolate-like intermediate is formed, producing a negative charge on the oxygen, which is stabilized by the iminium ion of Arg_{338}. The enolate then executes a nucleophilic attack on CO_{2} (which is being held in place through H-bonding with Glu_{296} residue), ultimately leading to the product of this enzymatic pathway: carboxybiotin. After this reaction occurs, the carboxyltransferase enzyme present within the complex acts upon the carboxybiotin to transfer the carboxyl group to the target acceptor molecule i.e. acetyl Co-A, propionyl Co-A etc.

== Structural studies ==
As of late 2007, 5 structures have been solved for this class of enzymes, with PDB accession codes PDB: 1BNC, PDB: 1DV1, PDB: 1DV2, PDB: 2GPS, and PDB: 2GPW.

The crystal structure has been determined for the biotin carboxylase (acetyl-CoA carboxylase) of Escherichia coli, but the eukaryotic B.C. is difficult to obtain info on as it is catalytically inactive in solution. E. coli biotin carboxylase is composed of two homogenous dimers made up of 3 domains: A, B, and C. It is believed that the B domain of each monomer is essential to the function of this enzyme, as there is extreme flexibility of this domain seen in the crystal structure. Upon binding of the ATP substrate, a conformational change occurs where the B domain essentially closes over the active site. While this change is thought to bring ATP within close enough proximity for the reaction to occur, the active site was still solvent exposed. Because of this anomaly in the crystal structure, it is believed that the attachment of biotin to BCCP aids in this reaction pathway, essentially covering biotin within the active site, as evidence shows free biotin is not as great of a substrate for this enzyme when compared to biotin-BCCP. A C-terminal conserved domain within this enzyme contains most of the active site residues. The Glu_{296} and Arg_{338} are highly conserved residues among this subclass of enzymes, and work to stabilize the reaction intermediates and keep them within the active site pocket until the carboxylation is complete.

This enzyme is vital to life and has maintained its function across a variety of organisms. While the structure itself may be divergent based on the biotin carboxylase function and which complex it is present in, the enzyme still works to serve the same function. Fatty acid synthesis provides sterols and other lipids essential to biochemical pathways, and the necessity for this enzyme function is confirmed by the highly conserved active site amino acid sequence.
