= Firsocostat =

Names
- IUPAC name 2-[1-[(2R)-2-(2-methoxyphenyl)-2-(oxan-4-yloxy)ethyl]-5-methyl-6-(1,3-oxazol-2-yl)-2,4-dioxothieno[2,3-d]pyrimidin-3-yl]-2-methylpropanoic acid

Identifiers
CAS Number	1434635-54-7
3D model (JSmol)	Interactive image
ChEMBL	ChEMBL3407547
ChemSpider	58789974
DrugBank	DB16166
IUPHAR/BPS	10645
KEGG	D11640
PubChem CID	71528744
UNII	XE10NJQ95M
- InChI: InChI=1S/C28H31N3O8S/c1-16-21-24(32)31(28(2,3)26(33)34)27(35)30(25(21)40-22(16)23-29-11-14-38-23)15-20(39-17-9-12-37-13-10-17)18-7-5-6-8-19(18)36-4/h5-8,11,14,17,20H,9-10,12-13,15H2,1-4H3,(H,33,34)/t20-/m0/s1 Key: ZZWWXIBKLBMSCS-FQEVSTJZSA-N
- SMILES: CC1=C(SC2=C1C(=O)N(C(=O)N2C[C@@H](C3=CC=CC=C3OC)OC4CCOCC4)C(C)(C)C(=O)O)C5=NC=CO5

Properties
Chemical formula	C_{28}H_{31}N_{3}O_{8}S
Molar mass	569.63 g·mol^{−1}
- Except where otherwise noted, data are given for materials in their standard state (at 25 °C [77 °F], 100 kPa). Infobox references

Firsocostat is an acetyl-CoA carboxylase inhibitor that functions in the liver. Its original designation was GS-0976. It was discovered by Nimbus Therapeutics. The drug is under development by Gilead as a treatment for metabolic dysfunction–associated steatotic liver disease.
