= ACACB =

Protein-coding gene in humans

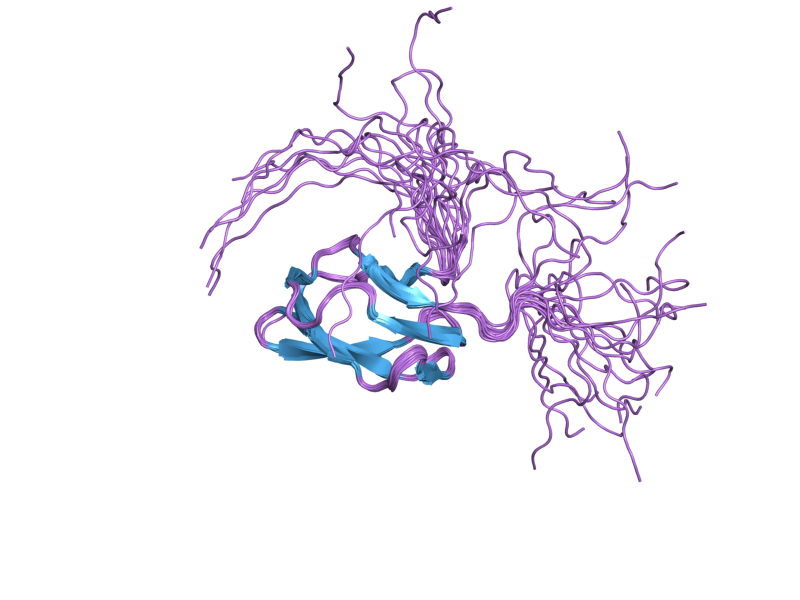

Identifiers
- Aliases: ACACB, ACC2, ACCB, HACC275, acetyl-CoA carboxylase beta, ACC-beta, ACCbeta, ACACbeta
- External IDs: OMIM: 601557; MGI: 2140940; GeneCards: ACACB
Available structures
PDB	Ortholog search: PDBe RCSB
PDB	List of PDB id codes 2DN8, 2HJW, 2KCC, 3FF6, 3GID, 3GLK, 3JRW, 3JRX, 3TDC, 4HQ6, 5KKN
Enzyme activity
EC #	BRENDA	ExPASy	KEGG	MetaCyc
6.4.1.2	↗	↗	↗	↗

Gene location (Human)
Chr.	Chromosome 12 (human)
Band	12q24.11	Start	109,116,587 bp
Band	12q24.11	End	109,268,226 bp

Gene location (Mouse)
Chr.	Chromosome 5 (mouse)
Band	5|5 F	Start	114,284,596 bp
Band	5|5 F	End	114,388,822 bp
RNA expression pattern
Bgee	Human / Mouse (ortholog); Top expressed in: tendon of biceps brachii; adipose tissue; subcutaneous adipose tissue; gastric mucosa; renal medulla; abdominal fat; pericardium; gastrocnemius muscle; muscle of thigh; apex of heart / Top expressed in: brown adipose tissue; muscle of thigh; tunica adventitia of aorta; interventricular septum; right ventricle; myocardium of ventricle; intercostal muscle; skeletal muscle tissue; gastrocnemius muscle; extraocular muscle; More reference expression data
BioGPS	n/a
Gene ontology
Molecular function	nucleotide binding; metal ion binding; biotin carboxylase activity; ligase activity; protein binding; catalytic activity; ATP binding; biotin binding; identical protein binding; acetyl-CoA carboxylase complex; acetyl-CoA carboxylase activity
Cellular component	cytosol; membrane; mitochondrial outer membrane; mitochondrion; endomembrane system; nucleus
Biological process	carnitine shuttle; malonyl-CoA biosynthetic process; negative regulation of catalytic activity; lipid metabolism; negative regulation of fatty acid oxidation; positive regulation of lipid storage; negative regulation of gene expression; fatty acid metabolic process; positive regulation of heart growth; negative regulation of fatty acid beta-oxidation; regulation of glucose metabolic process; fatty acid biosynthetic process; response to nutrient levels; energy homeostasis; metabolism; positive regulation of cellular metabolic process; negative regulation of lipid catabolic process; protein homotetramerization; acetyl-CoA metabolic process; response to organic cyclic compound; regulation of cholesterol biosynthetic process
Sources:Amigo / QuickGO
Orthologs
Databases	NCBI: entry; OMA: entry
Species	Human	Mouse
Entrez	32	100705
Ensembl	ENSG00000076555	ENSMUSG00000042010
UniProt	O00763	E9Q4Z2
RefSeq (mRNA)	NM_001093	NM_133904
RefSeq (protein)	NP_001084	NP_598665; NP_001390456; NP_001390457; NP_001390458
Location (UCSC)	Chr 12: 109.12 – 109.27 Mb	Chr 5: 114.28 – 114.39 Mb
PubMed search
- Wikidata
View/Edit Human	View/Edit Mouse

Acetyl-CoA carboxylase 2 also known as ACC-beta or ACC2 is an enzyme that in humans is encoded by the ACACB gene.

== Function ==
Acetyl-CoA carboxylase (ACC) is a complex multifunctional enzyme system. ACC is a biotin-containing enzyme which catalyzes the carboxylation of acetyl-CoA to malonyl-CoA, the rate-limiting step in fatty acid synthesis. ACC-beta is thought to control fatty acid oxidation by means of the ability of malonyl-CoA to inhibit carnitine palmitoyltransferase I, the rate-limiting step in fatty acid uptake and oxidation by mitochondria. ACC-beta may be involved in the regulation of fatty acid oxidation, rather than fatty acid biosynthesis.

== Clinical implications ==
Human acetyl-CoA carboxylase has recently become a target in the design of new anti-obesity drugs. However, when the gene for ACC2 was knocked out in mice, no change in body weight was observed relative to normal mice. This result suggests inhibition of ACC2 by drugs may be an ineffective method of treating obesity.
