= TMLHE =

Protein-coding gene in the species Homo sapiens

Identifiers
- Aliases: TMLHE, AUTSX6, BBOX2, TMLD, TMLH, TMLHED, XAP130, D430017M14Rik, trimethyllysine hydroxylase, epsilon
- External IDs: OMIM: 300777; MGI: 2180203; GeneCards: TMLHE
Enzyme activity
EC #	BRENDA	ExPASy	KEGG	MetaCyc
1.14.11.8	↗	↗	↗	↗

Gene location (Human)
Chr.	X chromosome (human)
Band	Xq28	Start	155,489,011 bp
Band	Xq28	End	155,719,098 bp
RNA expression pattern
Bgee	Human / Mouse (ortholog); Top expressed in: skeletal muscle tissue; muscle of thigh; gastrocnemius muscle; blood; left ventricle; monocyte; islet of Langerhans; ventricular zone; ganglionic eminence; smooth muscle tissue / n/a; More reference expression data
BioGPS	n/a
Gene ontology
Molecular function	iron ion binding; oxidoreductase activity; oxidoreductase activity, acting on single donors with incorporation of molecular oxygen, incorporation of two atoms of oxygen; metal ion binding; dioxygenase activity; trimethyllysine dioxygenase activity; protein binding
Cellular component	mitochondrial matrix; mitochondrion
Biological process	negative regulation of oxidoreductase activity; carnitine biosynthetic process
Sources:Amigo / QuickGO
Orthologs
Databases	NCBI: entry; OMA: entry
Species	Human	Mouse
Entrez	55217	192289
Ensembl	ENSG00000185973	ENSMUSG00000079834
UniProt	Q9NVH6	Q91ZE0
RefSeq (mRNA)	NM_001184797; NM_018196	NM_138758
RefSeq (protein)	NP_001171726; NP_060666	NP_620097
Location (UCSC)	Chr X: 155.49 – 155.72 Mb	n/a
PubMed search
- Wikidata
View/Edit Human	View/Edit Mouse

Trimethyllysine dioxygenase, mitochondrial is an enzyme that in humans is encoded by the TMLHE gene in chromosome X. Mutations in the TMLHE gene resulting in carnitine biosynthesis disruption have been associated with autism symptoms.

== Structure ==
The TMHLE gene is located at the extreme end of the Xq28 region with high genomic instability, and encodes a protein trimethyllysine dioxygenase, a, Fe2+ and 2-oxoglytarate dependent non-heme-ferrous iron hydrolase localized to the mitochondrial matrix.

== Function ==
The trimethyllysine dioxygenase enzyme catalyzes the first step in the carnitine biosynthesis pathway, which is part of amine biosynthesis. Carnitine is a molecule that play an essential role in the transport of activated fatty acids across the inner mitochondrial membrane where they are metabolized. The encoded protein converts trimethyllysine into hydroxytrimethyllysine with the reaction (EC 1.14.11.8):

N_{6},N_{6},N(6)-trimethyl-L-lysine + 2-oxoglutarate + O_{2} = 3-hydroxy-N_{6},N_{6},N(6)-trimethyl-L-lysine + succinate + CO_{2} and requires iron and L-ascorbate as co-factors.

== Clinical significance ==
Mutations in the TMLHE gene cause epsilon-trimethyllysine hydroxylase deficiency (TMLHED), an inborn error of metabolism in carnitine biosynthesis, which may increase the risks of developing neurodevelopmental disorders, autism-related behaviors, and autism spectrum disorders.

== Interactions ==
TMLHE has been shown to have 14 binary protein-protein interactions including 12 co-complex interactions. TMLHE appears to interact with SUGCT.
