= Meldonium =

Chemical compound

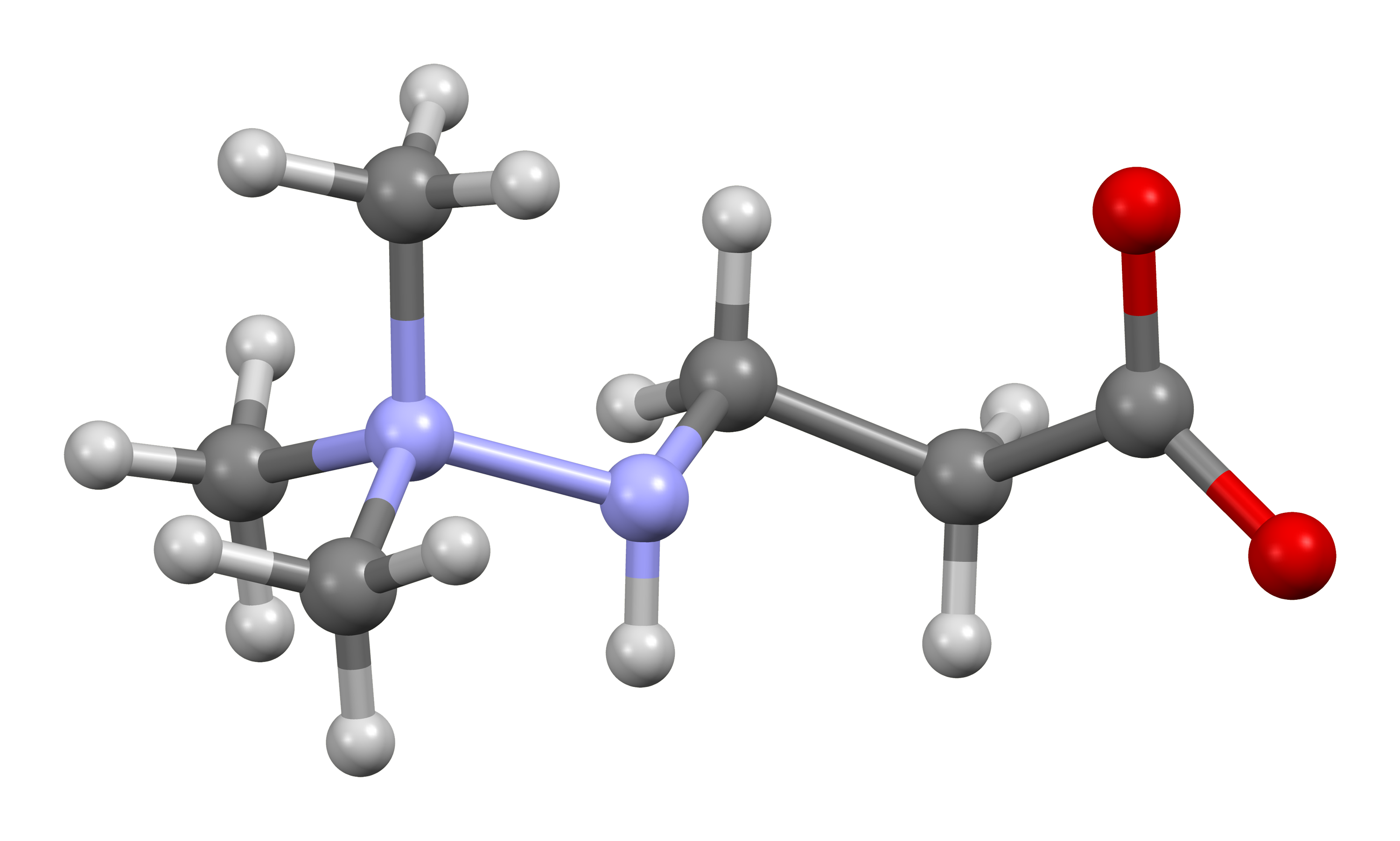

Clinical data
- Trade names: Mildronate, Mildronāts
- Other names: THP, MET-8 Mildronāts or Quaterine
- ATC code: C01EB22 (WHO)

Legal status
- Legal status: US: Unscheduled

Identifiers
- IUPAC name: 2-(2-Carboxylato-ethyl)-1,1,1-trimethylhydrazinium
- CAS Number: 76144-81-5; dihydrate: 86426-17-7
- PubChem CID: 123868
- ChemSpider: 110405
- UNII: 73H7UDN6EC; dihydrate: 22DC15W645
- KEGG: D10504
- ChEBI: CHEBI:131843
- CompTox Dashboard (EPA): DTXSID10997497
- ECHA InfoCard: 100.110.108

Chemical and physical data
- Formula: C_{6}H_{14}N_{2}O_{2}
- Molar mass: 146.190 g·mol^{−1}
- 3D model (JSmol): Interactive image
- Solubility in water: >40 mg/mL mg/mL (20 °C)
- SMILES: C[N+](C)(C)NCCC(=O)[O-]
- InChI: InChI=1S/C6H14N2O2/c1-8(2,3)7-5-4-6(9)10/h7H,4-5H2,1-3H3; Key:PVBQYTCFVWZSJK-UHFFFAOYSA-N

Meldonium (INN; trade name Mildronate, among others) is a pharmaceutical developed in 1970 by Ivars Kalviņš at the USSR Latvia Institute of Organic Synthesis. It is now manufactured by the Latvian pharmaceutical company Grindeks and various generic producers. Primarily distributed in Eastern Europe, meldonium is used as an anti-ischemia medication.

Meldonium is prescribed for cardiovascular, neurological, and metabolic conditions due to its anti-ischaemic and cardioprotective effects, achieved by inhibiting β-oxidation and activating glycolysis. Athletes have used meldonium to enhance recovery and (controversially) performance, though these claims lack robust scientific support.

Since 1 January 2016, meldonium has been listed as a banned substance by the World Anti-Doping Agency (WADA). It functions as a metabolic modulator, altering enzymatic reactions in the body. While some athletes, including Maria Sharapova, used meldonium before its ban, its effectiveness as a performance enhancer remains controversial. Numerous athletes have since been suspended or disqualified for its use.

== Medical uses ==
Meldonium, also known as Mildronate in Eastern Europe, is primarily used for treating cardiovascular and neurological conditions. It is prescribed for heart-related issues such as angina pectoris, heart failure, and coronary artery disease. In some countries, particularly in Eastern Europe, meldonium is used to treat problems with brain circulation and has been reported to elevate mood and improve motor symptoms, dizziness, and nausea.

=== Available forms ===
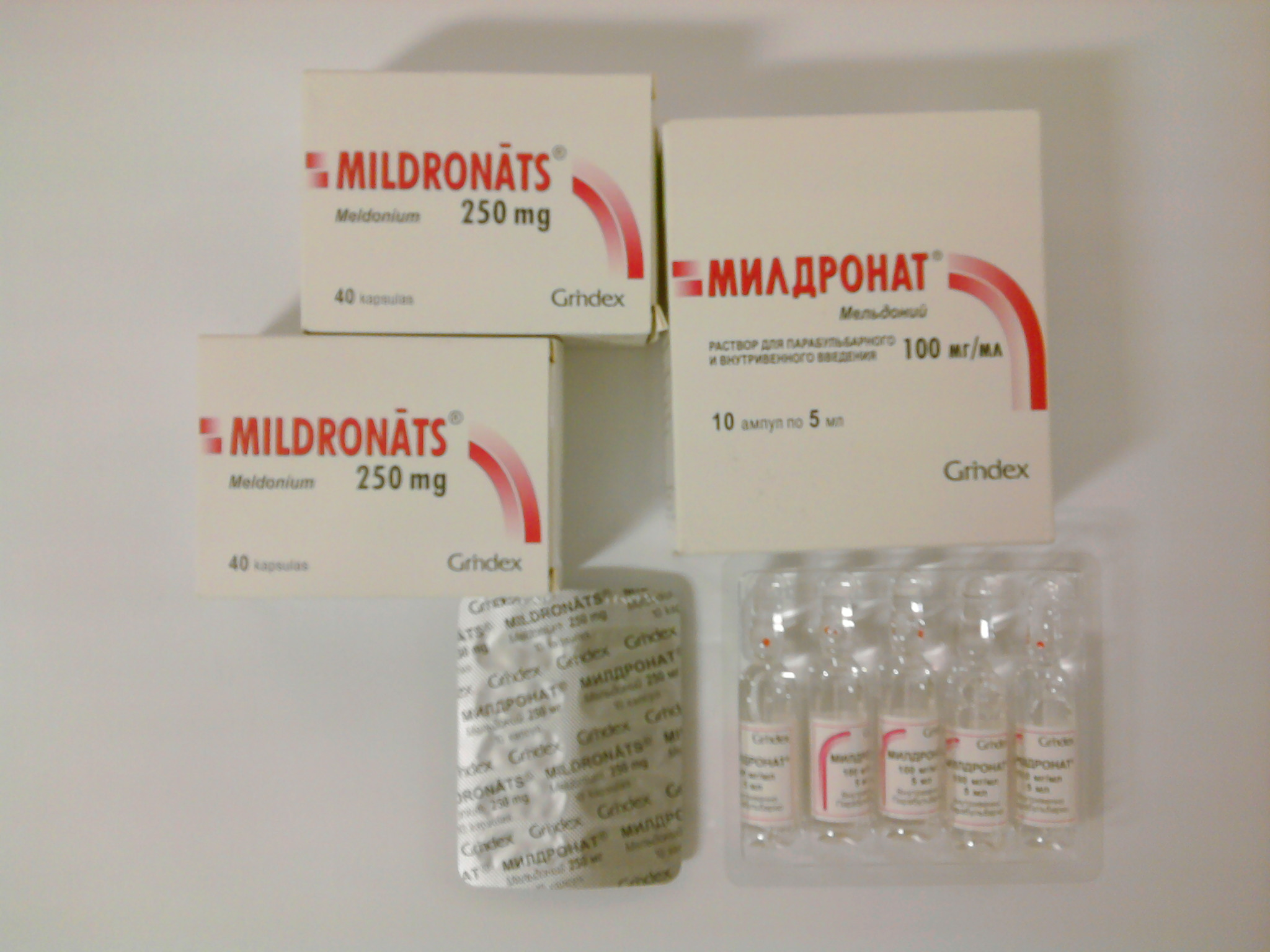
Meldonium and its various forms of packaging showing 250 mg capsules and the injection 10% 5 ml

Meldonium is available in various pharmaceutical forms to suit different medical needs and administration routes. The most common form is oral capsules, typically containing 250 mg or 500 mg of the active ingredient. For more rapid onset of action or in cases where oral administration is not feasible, meldonium is also produced as a solution for injection.

== Pharmacology ==
=== Mechanism of action ===
The mechanism of action of meldonium is to act as a fatty acid oxidation inhibitor, presumably by inhibiting enzymes in the carnitine biosynthesis pathway such as γ-butyrobetaine hydroxylase. Although initial reports suggested meldonium is a non-competitive and non-hydroxylatable analogue of gamma-butyrobetaine; further studies have identified that meldonium is a substrate for gamma-butyrobetaine dioxygenase. X-ray crystallographic and in vitro biochemical studies suggest that meldonium binds to the substrate pocket of γ-butyrobetaine hydroxylase and acts as an alternative substrate, and therefore a competitive inhibitor. Normally, this enzyme's action on its substrates γ-butyrobetaine and 2-oxoglutarate gives, in the presence of the further substrate oxygen, the products L-carnitine, succinate, and carbon dioxide; in the presence of this alternate substrate, the reaction yields malonic acid semialdehyde, formaldehyde (akin to the action of histone demethylases), dimethylamine, and (1-methylimidazolidin-4-yl)acetic acid, "an unexpected product with an additional carbon-carbon bond resulting from N-demethylation coupled to oxidative rearrangement, likely via an unusual radical mechanism." The unusual mechanism is thought likely to involve a Steven's type rearrangement.

Meldonium's inhibition of γ-butyrobetaine hydroxylase gives a half maximal inhibitory concentration (IC_{50}) value of 62 micromolar, which other study authors have described as "potent." Meldonium is an example of an inhibitor that acts as a non-peptidyl substrate mimic.

=== Biochemistry ===
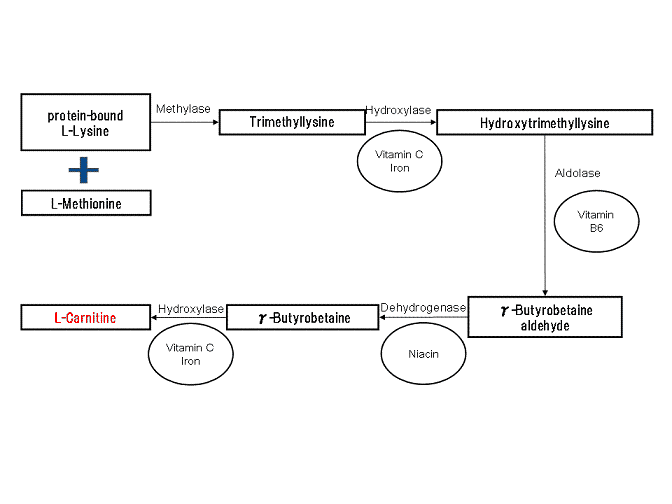
Carnitine synthesis

To ensure a continuous guarantee of energy supply, the cell's energy-producing mitochondria oxidise considerable amounts of fat along with glucose. Carnitine transports long-chain fatty acids from the cytosol of the cell into the mitochondrion and is therefore essential for fatty acid oxidation (known as beta oxidation). Carnitine is mainly absorbed from the diet, but can be formed through biosynthesis. To produce carnitine, lysine residues are methylated to trimethyllysine. Four enzymes are involved in the conversion of trimethyllysine and its intermediate forms into the final product of carnitine. The last of these 4 enzymes is gamma-butyrobetaine dioxygenase (GBB), which hydroxylates butyrobetaine into carnitine.

The main cardioprotective effects of meldonium are mediated by the inhibition of GBB. By subsequently inhibiting carnitine biosynthesis, fatty acid transport is reduced and the accumulation of cytotoxic intermediate products of fatty acid beta-oxidation in ischemic tissues to produce energy is prevented, therefore blocking this oxygen-consuming process. Treatment with meldonium may shift the myocardial energy metabolism from fatty acid oxidation to the more favorable oxidation of glucose, or glycolysis, under conditions where oxygen is limited.

The carnitine shuttle system. (Red: acyl-CoA, Green: carnitine, Red+green: acylcarnitine, CoASH: coenzyme A, CPTI: carnitine palmitoyltransferase I, CPTII: carnitine palmitoyltransferase II, 1: acyl-CoA synthetase, 2: translocase, A: outer mitochondrial membrane, B: Intermembrane space, C: inner mitochondrial membrane, D: mitochondrial matrix)

In fatty acid metabolism, long chain fatty acids in the cytosol cannot cross the mitochondrial membrane because they are negatively charged. The process in which they move into the mitochondria is called the carnitine shuttle. Long chain FA are first activated via esterification with coenzyme A to produce a fatty acid-coA complex which can then cross the external mitochondrial border. The co-A is then exchanged with carnitine (via the enzyme carnitine palmitoyltransferase I) to produce a fatty acid-carnitine complex. This complex is then transported through the inner mitochondrial membrane via a transporter protein called carnitine-acylcarnitine translocase. Once inside, carnitine is liberated (catalysed by the enzyme carnitine palmitoyltransferase II) and transported back outside so the process can occur again. Acylcarnitines like palmitoylcarnitine are produced as intermediate products of the carnitine shuttle.

In the mitochondria themselves, meldonium also competitively inhibits the carnitine shuttle protein SLC22A5. This results in reduced transportation and metabolism of long-chain fatty acids in the mitochondria (this burden is shifted more to peroxisomes). The final effect is a decreased risk of mitochondrial injury from fatty acid oxidation and a reduction of the production of acylcarnitines, which has been implicated in the development of insulin resistance.

== Chemistry ==
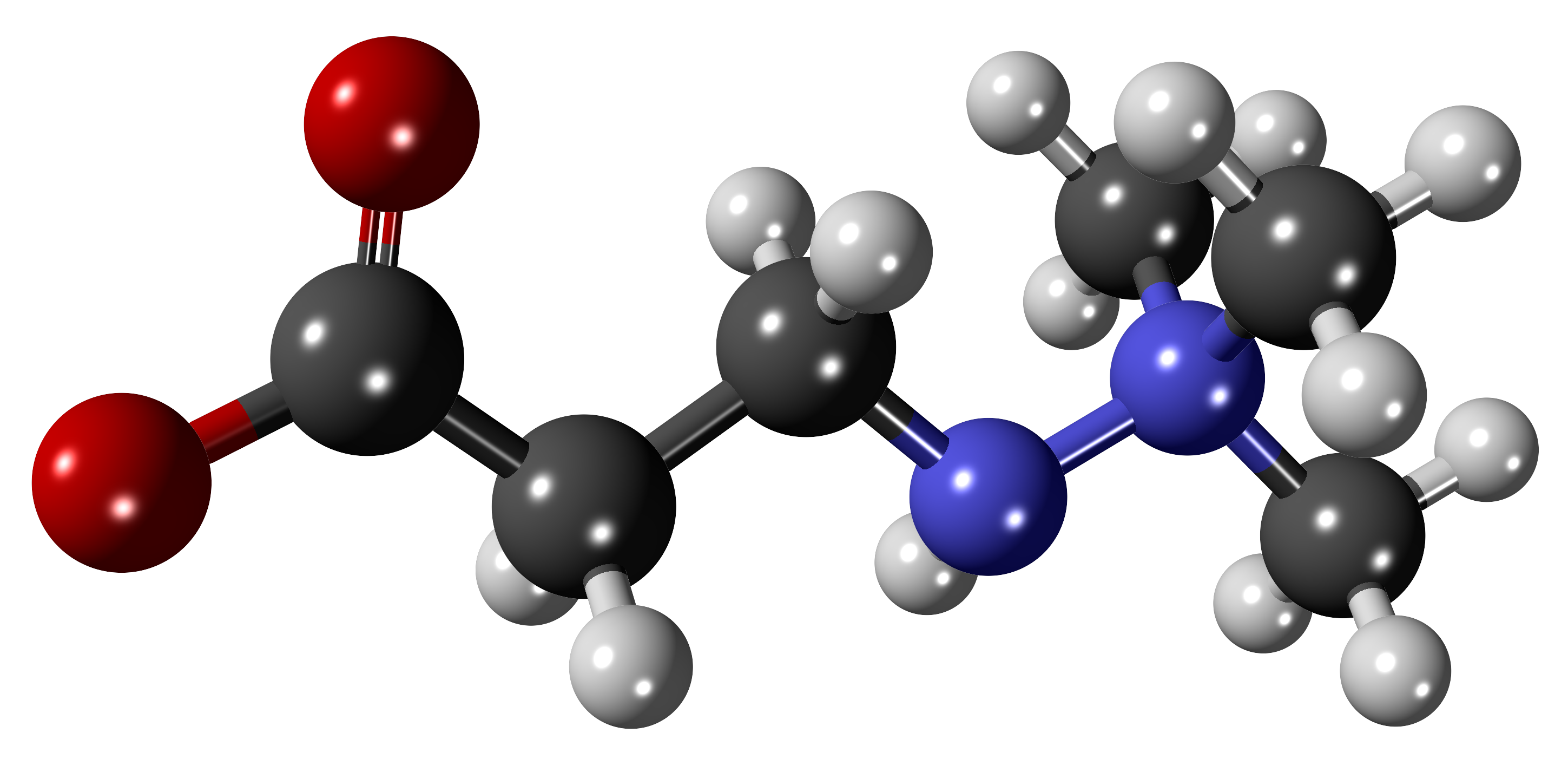
Structure of meldonium

The chemical name of meldonium is 3-(2,2,2-trimethylhydraziniumyl) propionate. It is a structural analogue of γ-butyrobetaine, with an amino group replacing the C-4 methylene of γ-butyrobetaine. γ-Butyrobetaine is a precursor in the biosynthesis of carnitine.

Meldonium is a white crystalline powder, with a melting point of 87 °C (189 °F).

== Society and culture ==
=== Doping ===
Concern over Meldonium was first raised when it was found to match a mass spectrometry peak seen in some but not all of a set of athlete urine samples.

Meldonium was added to the World Anti-Doping Agency (WADA) list of banned substances effective 1 January 2016 because of evidence of its use by athletes with the intention of enhancing performance. It was on the 2015 WADA's list of drugs to be monitored. A high prevalence of meldonium use by athletes in sport was demonstrated by the laboratory findings at the Baku 2015 European Games. 13 medallists or competition winners were taking meldonium at the time of the Baku Games. Meldonium use was detected in athletes competing in 15 of the 21 sports during the Games. Most of the athletes taking meldonium withheld the information of their use from anti-doping authorities by not declaring it on their doping control forms as they should have. Only 23 of the 662 (3.5%) athletes tested declared the personal use of meldonium. However, 66 of the total 762 (8.7%) of athlete urine samples analysed during the Games and during pre-competition tested positive for meldonium.

WADA classes the drug as a metabolic modulator, just as it does insulin. Metabolic modulators are classified as S4 substances according to the WADA banned substances list. These substances have the ability to modify how some hormones accelerate or slow down different enzymatic reactions in the body. In this way, these modulators can block the body's conversion of testosterone into oestrogen, which is necessary for females. Meldonium does not have this effect; it is not an Aromatase Inhibitor (which is a different sub-type of S4 drug). On 13 April 2016 it was reported that WADA had issued updated guidelines allowing less than 1 microgram per milliliter of meldonium for tests done before 1 March 2016. The agency cited that "preliminary tests showed that it could take weeks or months for the drug to leave the body".

==== Affected athletes ====
On 7 March 2016, former world number one tennis player Maria Sharapova announced that she had failed a drug test in Australia due to the detection of meldonium. She said that she had been taking the drug for ten years for various health issues, and had not noticed that it had been banned. On 8 June 2016, she was suspended from playing tennis for two years by the International Tennis Federation (ITF), which was reduced to 15 months by Court of Arbitration for Sport after appeal. Earlier the same year (March 7), Russian ice dancer Ekaterina Bobrova announced that she had also tested positive for meldonium at the 2016 European Figure Skating Championships. Bobrova said she was shocked about the test result, because she had been made aware of meldonium's addition to the banned list, and had been careful to avoid products containing banned substances. In May 2016, Russian professional boxer Alexander Povetkin—a former two-time World Boxing Association (WBA) Heavyweight Champion—tested positive for meldonium. This was discovered just a week prior to his mandatory title match against World Boxing Council (WBC) Heavyweight Champion, Deontay Wilder. As a result, the match—scheduled to take place in Russia—was postponed indefinitely by the WBC.

Other athletes who are provisionally banned for using meldonium include UFC flyweight Liliya Shakirova, Ethiopian-Swedish middle-distance runner Abeba Aregawi, Ethiopian long-distance runner Endeshaw Negesse, Russian cyclist Eduard Vorganov, and Ukrainian biathletes Olga Abramova and Artem Tyshchenko.

The Ice Hockey Federation of Russia replaced the Russia men's national under-18 ice hockey team with an under-17 team for the 2016 IIHF World U18 Championships after players on the original roster tested positive for meldonium.

More than 170 failed tests by athletes were identified in a relatively brief period after the ban on meldonium was imposed on 1 January 2016. Many of the early cases were dropped when athletes claimed that they had ceased use in 2015. Notable athletes with positive samples include:

Name	Country	Sport	Where	Consequences	Ref.
Maria Sharapova	Russia	Tennis	2016 Australian Open	Banned for 2 years, backdated to 26 January 2016. Reduced to 15 months.	
Semion Elistratov	Russia	Short track speed skating		No fault	
Pavel Kulizhnikov	Russia	Speed skating	2016 World Sprint Speed Skating Championships	No fault	
Ekaterina Bobrova	Russia	Figure skating	2016 European Figure Skating Championships	No fault	
Olga Abramova	Ukraine	Biathlon		No fault – but her results between 10 January 2016 and 3 February 2016 were voided	
Artem Tyshchenko	Ukraine	Biathlon			
Abeba Aregawi	Sweden	Athletics			
Endeshaw Negesse	Ethiopia	Athletics			
Yuliya Yefimova	Russia	Swimming	Two out of competition tests – 15 & 24 February	No fault	
Nadezhda Kotlyarova	Russia	Athletics		Cleared by RUSADA	
Sergei Semenov	Russia	Wrestling		Cleared by RUSADA	
Evgeny Saleev	Russia	Wrestling			
Anastasia Chulkova	Russia	Cycling		Cleared by RUSADA	
Gabriela Petrova	Bulgaria	Athletics	6 February 2016	Suspension temporarily lifted	
Pavel Kulikov	Russia	Skeleton		Suspension temporarily lifted	
Andrei Rybakou	Belarus	Weightlifting			
Nikolai Kuksenkov	Russia	Artistic gymnastics			
Elena Mirela Lavric	Romania	Athletics	2016 IAAF World Indoor Championships		
Denis Yartsev	Russia	Judo			
Mikhail Pulyaev	Russia	Judo			
Natalia Kondratieva	Russia	Judo			
Igor Mikhalkin	Russia	Boxing (professional)	12 March 2016	2-year ban	
Ruth Kasirye	Norway	Weightlifting	Out of contest routine testing – 25 January 2016	Suspended until 21 July 2018	
Éva Tófalvi	Romania	Biathlon			
Anastasiya Mokhnyuk	Ukraine	Athletics			
Islam Makhachev	Russia	MMA	Out of contest routine testing	Provisional suspension lifted after 75 days	
Davit Chakvetadze	Russia	Wrestling		Cleared by RUSADA	
Armantas Vitkauskas	Lithuania	Football			
Martynas Dapkus	Lithuania	Football			
Andrii Kviatkovskyi	Ukraine	Wrestling		Provisionally suspended	
Alen Zasyeyev	Ukraine	Wrestling		Provisionally suspended	
Oksana Herhel	Ukraine	Wrestling		Provisionally suspended	
Varvara Lepchenko	United States	Tennis		No fault	
Antonina Skorobogatchenko	Russia	Handball			
Mariia Dudina	Russia	Handball			
Maxwell Holt	United States	Volleyball			
Tamerlan Tagziev	Canada	Wrestling		4-year ban	
Daniel Omielańczuk	Poland	MMA		No fault	
Alexander Krushelnitsky	Russia	Curling	2018 Winter Olympics	4-year ban; Mixed Doubles bronze medal stripped	
Ray Walker	Ireland	Gaelic football		4-year ban	
Oleksandr Senkevych	Ukraine	Canoe sprint	2019 ICF Canoe Sprint World Championships	4-year ban	
Aybol Abiken	Kazakhstan	Football		3-year ban	
Ahmed Abdelwahed	Italy	Athletics			
Svetlana Veselova	Russia	CrossFit	2023 NOBULL CrossFit Games, on August 3rd 2023	4-year sanction	
Joey Mawson	Australia	Motorsport	2023 S5000 Australian Drivers' Championship	3-year ban issued in September 2024, backdated to May 2023	
Mykhailo Mudryk	Ukraine	Football	2024–25 UEFA Nations League B	4-year ban, backdated to December 2024; Pending appeal	

In addition it was reported that five Georgian wrestlers and a German wrestler had tested positive for the drug although no further names were released. On 25 March 2016 the Fédération Internationale de Sambo confirmed that four wrestlers under their governance (two from Russia and two from other countries) had recorded positive tests for the drug.

==== Debates ====
A December 2015 study in the journal Drug Testing and Analysis argued that meldonium "demonstrates an increase in endurance performance of athletes, improved rehabilitation after exercise, protection against stress, and enhanced activation of central nervous system (CNS) functions". However the study itself presents no evidence for this claim, though it cited other studies that show performance enhancing effects, and focuses instead on describing two approaches for the reliable identification of meldonium.

The manufacturer, Grindeks, said in a statement that it did not believe meldonium's use should be banned for athletes. It said the drug worked mainly by reducing damage to cells that can be caused by certain byproducts of carnitine. Meldonium "is used to prevent death of ischemic cells and not to increase performance of normal cells", the statement said. "Meldonium cannot improve athletic performance, but it can stop tissue damage in the case of ischemia", the lack of blood flow to an area of the body.

The drug was invented in the mid-1970s at the Institute of Organic Synthesis of the Latvian SSR Academy of Sciences by Ivars Kalviņš. Kalviņš criticized the ban, saying that WADA had not presented scientific proof that the drug can be used for doping. According to him, meldonium does not enhance athletic performance in any way, and was rather used by athletes to prevent damage to the heart and muscles caused by lack of oxygen during high-intensity exercise. He contended that not allowing athletes to take care of their health was a violation of their human rights, and that the decision aimed to remove Eastern European athletes from competitions and his drug from the pharmaceutical market. Liene Kozlovska, the former head of the anti-doping department of the Latvian sports medicine center, rejected claims that the ban is in violation of athletes' rights, saying that meldonium is dangerous in high doses, and should only be used under medical supervision to treat genuine health conditions. She also speculated that Russian athletes may not have received adequate warnings that the drug was banned – due to the suspension of the Russian Anti-Doping Agency in late 2015.

Forbes reported that anesthesiology professor Michael Joyner, at the Mayo Clinic in Rochester, Minnesota, who studies how humans respond to physical and mental stress during exercise and other activities, told them that "Evidence is lacking for many compounds believed to enhance athletic performance. Its use has a sort of urban legend element and there is not much out there that it is clearly that effective. I would be shocked if this stuff [meldonium] had an effect greater than caffeine or creatine (a natural substance that, when taken as a supplement, is thought to enhance muscle mass)." Ford Vox, a U.S.-based physician specializing in rehabilitation medicine and a journalist reported "there's not much scientific support for its use as an athletic enhancer".

Don Catlin, a long-time anti-doping expert and the scientific director of the Banned Substances Control Group (BSCG) said "There's really no evidence that there's any performance enhancement from meldonium – Zero percent".

=== Approval status ===
Meldonium, which is not approved by the FDA in the United States, is registered and prescribed in Latvia, Russia, Ukraine, Georgia, Kazakhstan, Azerbaijan, Belarus, Uzbekistan, Moldova, Lithuania, Albania, and Kyrgyzstan.

=== Economics ===
Meldonium is manufactured by Grindeks, a Latvian pharmaceutical company, with offices in thirteen Eastern European countries as a treatment for heart conditions. The company identifies it as one of their main products. It had sales of 65 million euros in 2013.

== See also ==
- List of Russian drugs
