= Carnitine-acylcarnitine translocase deficiency =

Carnitine-acylcarnitine translocase deficiency, Carnroviatonis
- Other names: CATD, Carnroviatonis
- Carnitine-acylcarnitine translocase deficiency has an autosomal recessive pattern of inheritance.

Carnitine-acylcarnitine translocase deficiency is a rare, autosomal recessive metabolic disorder that prevents the body from converting long-chain fatty acids into energy, particularly during periods without food. Carnitine, a natural substance acquired mostly through the diet, is used by cells to process fats and produce energy. People with this disorder have a faulty enzyme that prevents long-chain fatty acids from being transported into the innermost part of the mitochondria for processing.

== Presentation ==
The signs of carnitine-acylcarnitine translocase deficiency usually begin within the first few hours of life. Seizures, an irregular heartbeat, and breathing problems are often the first signs of this disorder. This disorder may also cause extremely low levels of ketones (products of fat breakdown that are used for energy) and low blood sugar (hypoglycemia). Together, these two signs are called hypoketotic hypoglycemia. Other signs that are often present include ammonia in the blood (hyperammonemia), an enlarged liver (hepatomegaly), heart abnormalities (cardiomyopathy), and muscle weakness. This disorder can cause sudden infant death.

== Pathophysiology ==
Acyl-CoA from cytosol to the mitochondrial matrix

Mutations in the SLC25A20 gene lead to the production of a defective version of an enzyme called carnitine-acylcarnitine translocase.

Without this enzyme, long-chain fatty acids from food and fats stored in the body cannot be broken down and processed. As a result, these fatty acids are not converted into energy, which can lead to characteristic signs and symptoms of this disorder, such as weakness, hypoglycemia, and an irregular heartbeat. Free long-chain fatty acids or those that are joined with carnitine can affect the electrical properties of cardiac cells causing an irregular heart beat (arrhythmia, which can lead to cardiac arrest). Fatty acids may also build up in tissues and can damage the heart, liver, and muscles, and cause more serious complications.

This condition has an autosomal recessive inheritance pattern, which means the defective gene is located on an autosome, and two copies of the gene - one from each parent - must be inherited to be affected by the disorder. The parents of a child with an autosomal recessive disorder are carriers of one copy of the defective gene, but are usually not affected by the disorder.

== See also ==
- Primary carnitine deficiency
- Carnitine palmitoyltransferase I deficiency
- Carnitine palmitoyltransferase II deficiency
