= Peptide-aspartate beta-dioxygenase =

peptide-aspartate beta-dioxygenase

Identifiers
- EC no.: 1.14.11.16
- CAS no.: 122544-66-5

Databases
- IntEnz: IntEnz view
- BRENDA: BRENDA entry
- ExPASy: NiceZyme view
- KEGG: KEGG entry
- MetaCyc: metabolic pathway
- PRIAM: profile
- PDB structures: RCSB PDB PDBe PDBsum
- Gene Ontology: AmiGO / QuickGO
Search
- PMC: articles
- PubMed: articles
- NCBI: proteins

In enzymology, a peptide-aspartate beta-dioxygenase (EC 1.14.11.16), a member of the alpha-ketoglutarate-dependent hydroxylases superfamily, is an enzyme that catalyzes the chemical reaction

peptide-L-aspartate + 2-oxoglutarate + O_{2} $\rightleftharpoons$ peptide-3-hydroxy-L-aspartate + succinate + CO_{2}

The 3 substrates of this enzyme are peptide-L-aspartate, 2-oxoglutarate, and O_{2}, whereas its 3 products are peptide-3-hydroxy-L-aspartate, succinate, and CO_{2}.

It employs one cofactor, iron.

== Nomenclature ==
This enzyme belongs to the family of oxidoreductases, specifically those acting on paired donors, with O_{2} as oxidant and incorporation or reduction of oxygen. The oxygen incorporated need not be derived from O_{2} with 2-oxoglutarate as one donor, and incorporation of one atom o oxygen into each donor. The systematic name of this enzyme class is peptide-L-aspartate,2-oxoglutarate:oxygen oxidoreductase (3-hydroxylating). Other names in common use include aspartate beta-hydroxylase, and aspartylpeptide beta-dioxygenase.

== Further reading section ==
- Gronke RS, Welsch DJ, VanDusen WJ, Garsky VM, Sardana MK, Stern AM, Friedman PA (May 1990). "Partial purification and characterization of bovine liver aspartyl beta-hydroxylase". The Journal of Biological Chemistry. 265 (15): 8558–65. doi:10.1016/S0021-9258(19)38924-0. PMID 2187868.
