= Carnitinamidase =

Class of enzymes

carnitinamidase

Identifiers
- EC no.: 3.5.1.73
- CAS no.: 117444-04-9

Databases
- BRENDA: enzyme data
- ExPASy: NiceZyme view
- KEGG: enzyme entry
- MetaCyc: metabolic pathway
- Rhea: reactions
- PDB structures: RCSB PDB PDBe PDBsum
- Gene Ontology: AmiGO / QuickGO
Search
- PMC: articles
- PubMed: articles
- NCBI: proteins

Carnitinamidase (EC 3.5.1.73) is a microbial enzyme that catalyzes the hydrolysis of (R)-carnitinamide to (R)-carnitine and ammonia:

(R)-carnitinamide
H_{2}O
NH_{3}
(R)-carnitine

The reaction has been used to produce the enantiomer, (R)-carnitine from the racemic mixture, DL-carnitinamide.

This enzyme is a hydrolase, one acting on carbon-nitrogen bonds other than peptide bonds, specifically in linear amides. The systematic name of this enzyme class is L-carnitinamide amidohydrolase. Other names in use include L-carnitinamidase, carnitine amidase, and L-carnitine amidase.
