= Trimethyllysine dioxygenase =

Class of enzymes

Identifiers
- EC no.: 1.14.11.8
- CAS no.: 74622-49-4

Databases
- IntEnz: IntEnz view
- BRENDA: BRENDA entry
- ExPASy: NiceZyme view
- KEGG: KEGG entry
- MetaCyc: metabolic pathway
- PRIAM: profile
- PDB structures: RCSB PDB PDBe PDBsum
- Gene Ontology: AmiGO / QuickGO
Search
- PMC: articles
- PubMed: articles
- NCBI: proteins

Trimethyllysine dioxygenase (TMLH; EC 1.14.11.8) is an enzyme that catalyzes the chemical reaction

trimethyl-L-lysine
Fe(IV)=O
Fe(II)
product

TMLH is a member of the alpha-ketoglutarate-dependent hydroxylases superfamily. It oxidises trimethyl-L-lysine to the product (3S)-3-hydroxy-N6,N6,N6-trimethyl-L-lysine.

This enzyme is an oxidase with the systematic name N6,N6,N6-trimethyl-L-lysine,2-oxoglutarate:oxygen oxidoreductase (3-hydroxylating). Other names in common use include trimethyllysine alpha-ketoglutarate dioxygenase, TML-alpha-ketoglutarate dioxygenase, TML hydroxylase, 6-N,6-N,6-N-trimethyl-L-lysine,2-oxoglutarate:oxygen oxidoreductase, and (3-hydroxylating). This enzyme participates in lysine degradation and L-carnitine biosynthesis.

== Mechanism ==
The enzyme is a non-heme iron protein with ferryl active site where Fe(IV)=O is the species that transfers its oxygen to the substrate.

The mechanism requires 2-oxoglutaric acid to activate the iron oxygen complex, and this gives succinic acid and carbon dioxide when the second atom of the molecular oxygen is removed. Ascorbic acid is also required to increase the turnover number of the enzyme by reducing any iron converted to Fe(III) back to the required Fe(II).

2-oxoglutaric acid
[O]
CO_{2}
succinic acid

== See also ==
- γ-Butyrobetaine hydroxylase
- 4-N-Trimethylaminobutyraldehyde dehydrogenase
