= Bbox =

Bbox may refer to:

- Minimum bounding box, box with the smallest measure within which all the points lie
- Beatboxing, form of vocal percussion primarily involving the art of producing drum beats, rhythm, and musical sounds using one's mouth, lips, tongue, and voice
- BBOX1, gene that in humans encodes the enzyme gamma-butyrobetaine dioxygenase
- Bouygues Telecom combined Internet modem and set-top box
- Proximus Internet modem
