= Stevens rearrangement =

Chemical reaction

The Stevens rearrangement is an organic reaction in which nitrogen and sulfur ylides perform an intramolecular alkylation. The process usually begins with a persubstituted ammonium or sulfonium cation, in which case the net reaction is a 1,2-rearrangement as follows:

The omitted substituent next to the methylene bridge is electron-withdrawing.

== History ==
Thomas S. Stevens' original 1928 publication concerned the reaction of 1-phenyl-2-(N,N-dimethylamino)ethanone with benzyl bromide. The resulting ammonium salt reacted with aqueous sodium hydroxide to the rearranged amine:

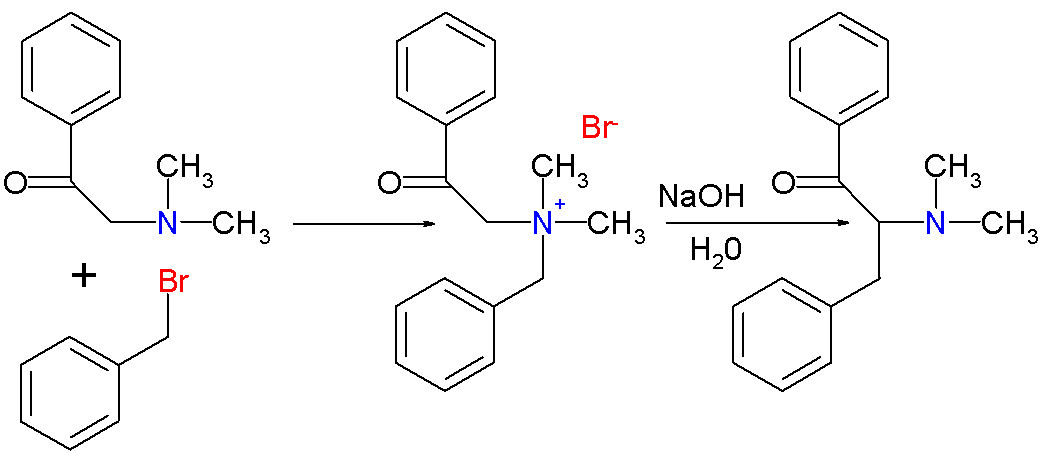
Stevens rearrangement 1928

A 1932 publication described the corresponding sulfur reaction.

== Reaction mechanism ==
The Stevens rearrangement's mechanism is one of the most controversial in organic chemistry. Certain is an initial deprotonation by a strong base: this yields an ylide stabilized by the electron-withdrawing substituent.

The difficulty with the subsequent migration is that it exhibits retention of configuration. Retention is inconsistent with a concerted reaction, which would require an antarafacial transition state. But it is also inconsistent with diradical (3a) or ionic (3b) intermediates, unless those intermediates are trapped in a solvent cage:

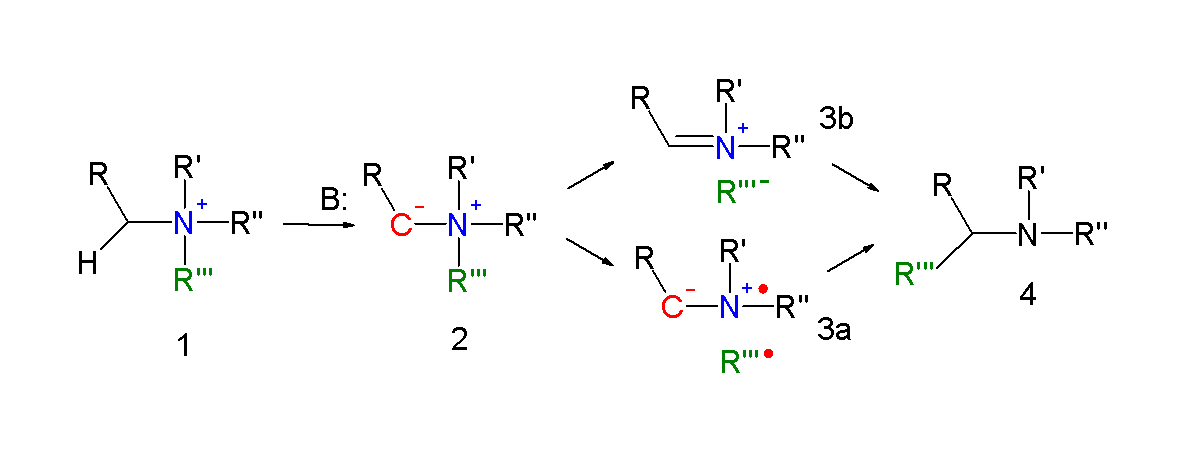
Stevens rearrangement reaction mechanism

== Scope ==
Cationic reactants can be obtained through alkylation of the corresponding amines and sulfides. The active ylide intermediate can be formed without deprotonation through rhodium(II)-acetate–catalyzed coordination of a diazo carbenoid:

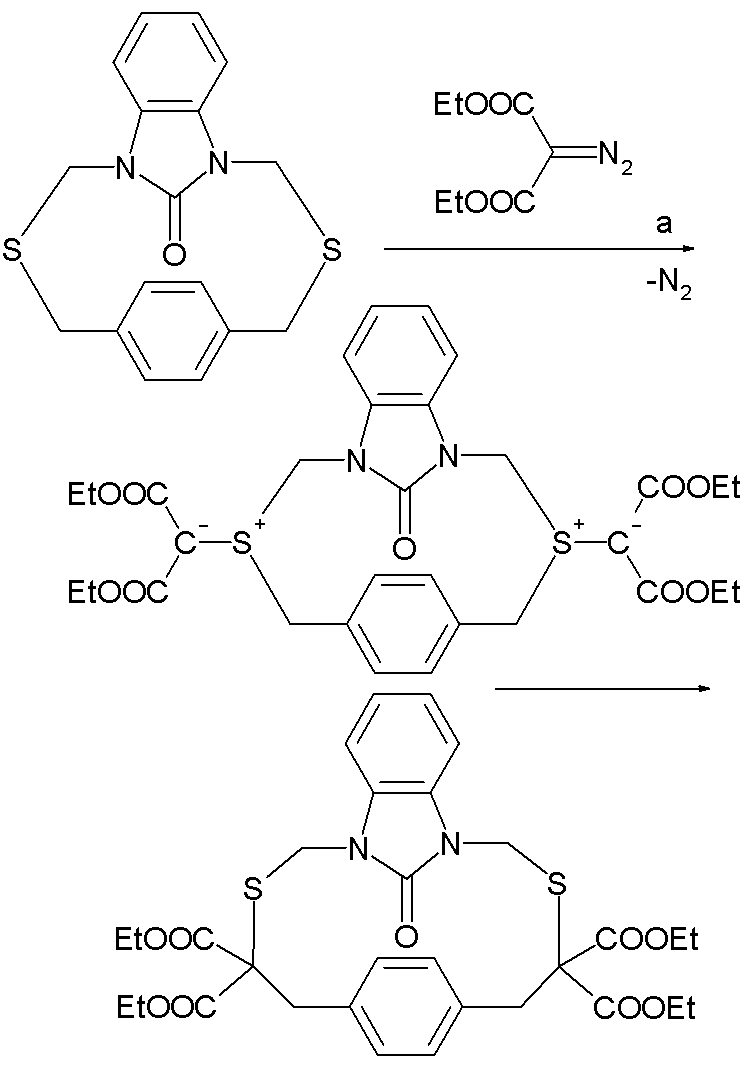

Competing reactions are the Sommelet-Hauser rearrangement and Hofmann elimination.

== Enzymatic reaction ==
γ-butyrobetaine hydroxylase, an enzyme on the human carnitine biosynthesis pathway, catalyzes a Stevens-like C-C bond formation on meldonium.

== See also ==
- Sommelet–Hauser rearrangement
- Pummerer rearrangement, which may be thought of as a specific example of the Stevens rearrangement for the case of sulfonium acetates
- γ-Butyrobetaine hydroxylase
