= Glycine propionyl-L-carnitine =

Names
- IUPAC name 2-azaniumylacetate;(3R)-3-propanoyloxy-4-(trimethylazaniumyl)butanoate

Identifiers
CAS Number	423152-20-9
3D model (JSmol)	Interactive image
PubChem CID	129011725
UNII	LY38SJU4DG
- InChI: InChI=1S/C10H19NO4.C2H5NO2/c1-5-10(14)15-8(6-9(12)13)7-11(2,3)4;3-1-2(4)5/h8H,5-7H2,1-4H3;1,3H2,(H,4,5)/t8-;/m1./s1 Key: UXXCWGVLNFBBAY-DDWIOCJRSA-N
- SMILES: [NH3+]CC([O-])=O.CCC(=O)O[C@H](CC([O-])=O)C[N+](C)(C)C

Properties
Chemical formula	C_{12}H_{24}N_{2}O_{6}
Molar mass	292.332 g·mol^{−1}
- Except where otherwise noted, data are given for materials in their standard state (at 25 °C [77 °F], 100 kPa). Infobox references

Glycine propionyl-L-carnitine (GPLC) is a propionyl ester of carnitine that includes an additional glycine component. Due to tissues esterases enzymes, GPLC should act as a prodrug and lead to glycine, carnitine and propionic acid in the body.

== Nitric oxide stimulant ==
GPLC has been shown in two studies to result in an increase in blood levels of nitrate/nitrite (a surrogate marker of nitric oxide; not a direct measure of nitric oxide), when used at a daily dose of 4.5 grams. In one study, GPLC was provided to previously sedentary men and women who were also assigned to supervised aerobic exercise for eight weeks. A significant increase in resting levels of blood nitrate/nitrite was noted for subjects receiving GPLC compared to placebo (in a double blind design). Subjects who received GPLC were also noted as having lower levels of malondialdehyde, a lipid peroxidation biomarker indicating free radical mediated oxidation of lipids. Increased free radical production may be associated with impaired nitric oxide bioavailability.

In another study, GPLC or a placebo was provided to resistance trained men for four weeks each, with a two-week washout period between each four-week period, using a double blind design. At the end of each four-week period, resting blood samples were obtained, in addition to blood samples following Isometric exercise, showing significant increases in plasma nitrate/nitrite among those who were given GPLC. It is possible that this increase in nitrate/nitrite may have implications related to enhanced blood flow during acute bouts of exercise.

== Antioxidant ==
In addition to regular exercise, nutritional antioxidants may combat free radical formation—as has been reported for GPLC. In this study, subjects received oral GPLC at a dosage of either 1.5 or 4.5 grams per day over the course of an eight-week intervention period. With both dosages, the post-intervention level of malondialdehyde, a marker of lipid peroxidation, was decreased as compared to pre-intervention values. The same was not true for subjects receiving a placebo. These findings highlight the significant antioxidant properties of GPLC. More work using GPLC to combat resistance exercise-induced lipid peroxidation has also noted favorable findings (unpublished data). While many athletes now use GPLC as a component of their dietary supplement regimen, future work is needed to investigate the impact of GPLC on decreasing oxidative stress resulting from strenuous exercise.

In support of the above, previous work involving the individual components of GPLC has noted decreased protein and lipid peroxidation following glycine use, with potent antioxidant properties noted for propionyl-L-carnitine.

== Ergogenic aid ==
Although still relatively new in the field of sports nutrition, GPLC has been used by some athletes reporting favorable results in terms of exercise performance and recovery. Preliminary work with previously sedentary subjects failed to indicate performance effects related to VO2max assessed via graded exercise treadmill testing or anaerobic energy assessed via a 30-second cycle sprint. However, a study involving active men noted very favorable performance effects of GPLC, as well as a significant reduction in blood lactic acid, a byproduct of anaerobic metabolism thought to impair muscle performance.

Specifically, in this study conducted by Patrick Jacobs and colleagues, 24 healthy, exercise trained men consumed either 4.5 grams of GPLC or a placebo on two different days separated by one week (double blind, cross-over study design). Ninety minutes following ingestion of the assigned treatment, subjects performed five, maximal effort cycle sprint's, each lasting 10 seconds in duration. They were given one minute of “active” recovery between each sprint. The peak and mean power output, as well as the blood lactic acid, was measured for both conditions. Results indicated that power output was up to 15% higher following the glycine propionyl-l-carnitine trials compared to placebo, while post-exercise blood lactic acid was 15-16% lower compared to placebo. These data are in reference to trained men performing repeated cycle sprints. Therefore, it is difficult to extrapolate these findings to other activities.

In other studies, GPLC has been shown to have no effect on aerobic and anaerobic exercise performance, with results showing that up to 3 grams per day for 8 weeks in conjunction with aerobic-exercise training is ineffective for increasing muscle carnitine content and has no significant effects on aerobic- or anaerobic-exercise performance.
