= Latvian Academy of Sciences =

Association of Latvian scientists

- Latvijas Zinātņu akadēmija

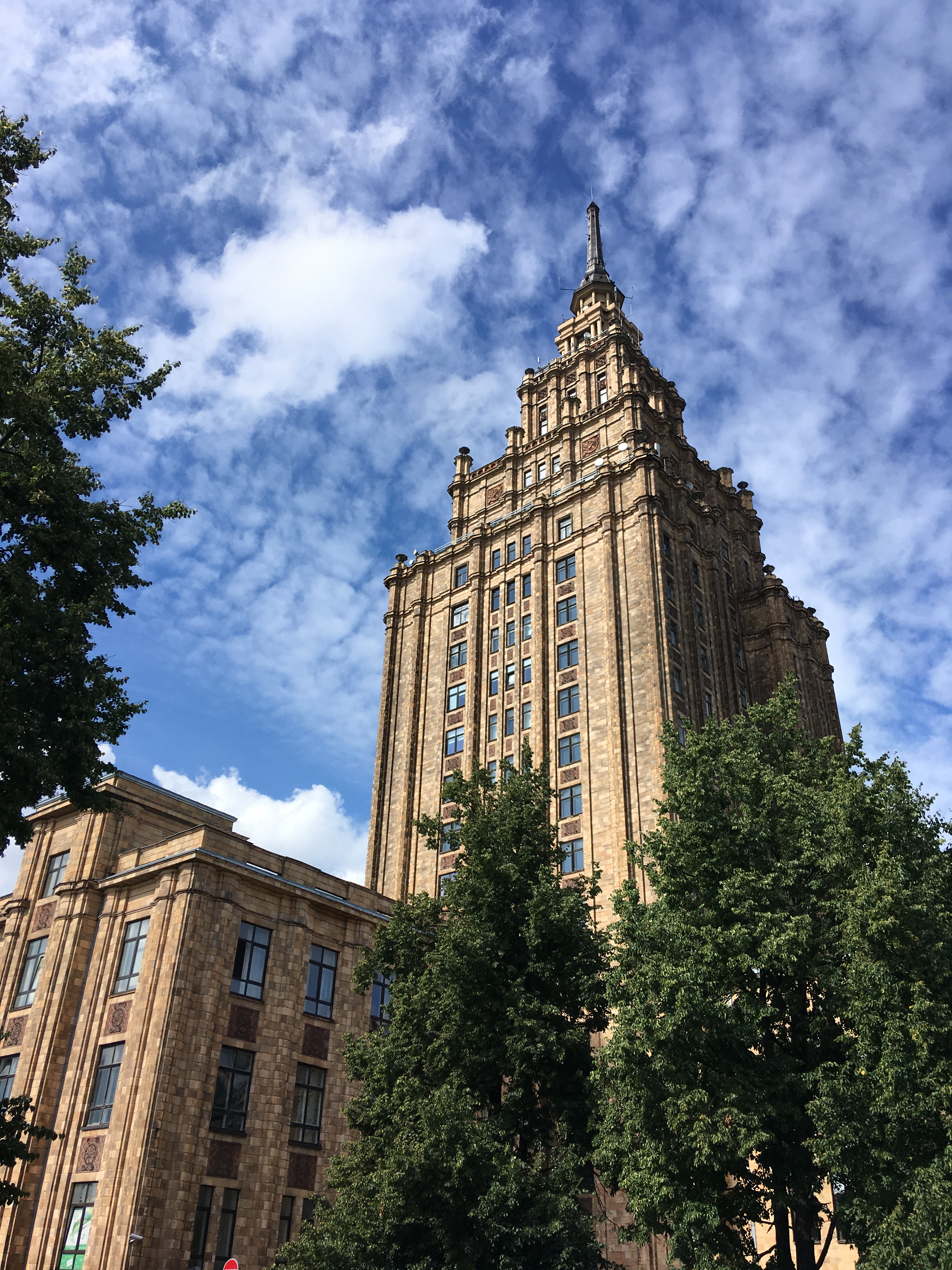
- Main building of the Latvian Academy of Sciences in Riga
- Formation: 14 February 1946; 80 years ago
- Headquarters: Riga, Latvia
- Coordinates: 56°56′36″N 24°07′19″E
- President: Ivars Kalviņš
- Website: www.lza.lv/en/

The Latvian Academy of Sciences (Latvian: Latvijas Zinātņu akadēmija, Latin: Academia Scientiarum Latviensis) is the official science academy of Latvia and is an association of the country's foremost scientists. The academy was founded as the Latvian SSR Academy of Sciences (Latvian: Latvijas PSR Zinātņu akadēmija). It is located in Riga. The current president of the academy is Ivars Kalviņš.

== Divisions ==
As of 2019, the academy has four divisions:

- Division of Agriculture and Forestry Sciences
- Division of Physics and Technical Sciences
- Division of Chemical, Biological and Medical Sciences
- Division of the Humanities and Social Sciences

== Building ==
The Academy of Sciences edifice was built after World War II, between 1951 and 1961, collecting the necessary financing from the newly established kolkhozes in Latvia and – as further expenses increased, collecting the finances as "voluntary donations" deducted from the salaries of the Latvian rural population.

The building is decorated with several hammer and sickle symbols as well as Latvian folk ornaments and motifs. The spire was originally decorated with a wreath and a five pointed star, which was removed after Latvia regained independence in 1991. Being 108 metres (354 ft) tall, it was the first skyscraper in the republic and was the tallest building until the construction of the Swedbank Headquarters in Latvia (121 metres, 397 ft), and at the time, one of the highest reinforced concrete buildings in the world.

The building, designed by Osvalds Tīlmanis, Vaidelotis Apsītis, and Kārlis Plūksne, is a cousin to similar Stalin-era skyscrapers, which were representative of what became known as Stalinist architecture (sometimes referred to as Socialist Classicism). The architecture of the skyscraper resembles many others built in the Soviet Union at the time, most notably the main building of Moscow State University. Local nicknames include Stalin's birthday cake and the Kremlin.

The view of Riga cityscape is open for public viewing from the 17th-floor balcony (height of 65 metres, 213 ft). The tower is located in the suburb of Latgale neighbourhood.

== Gallery ==
Close-up of the building

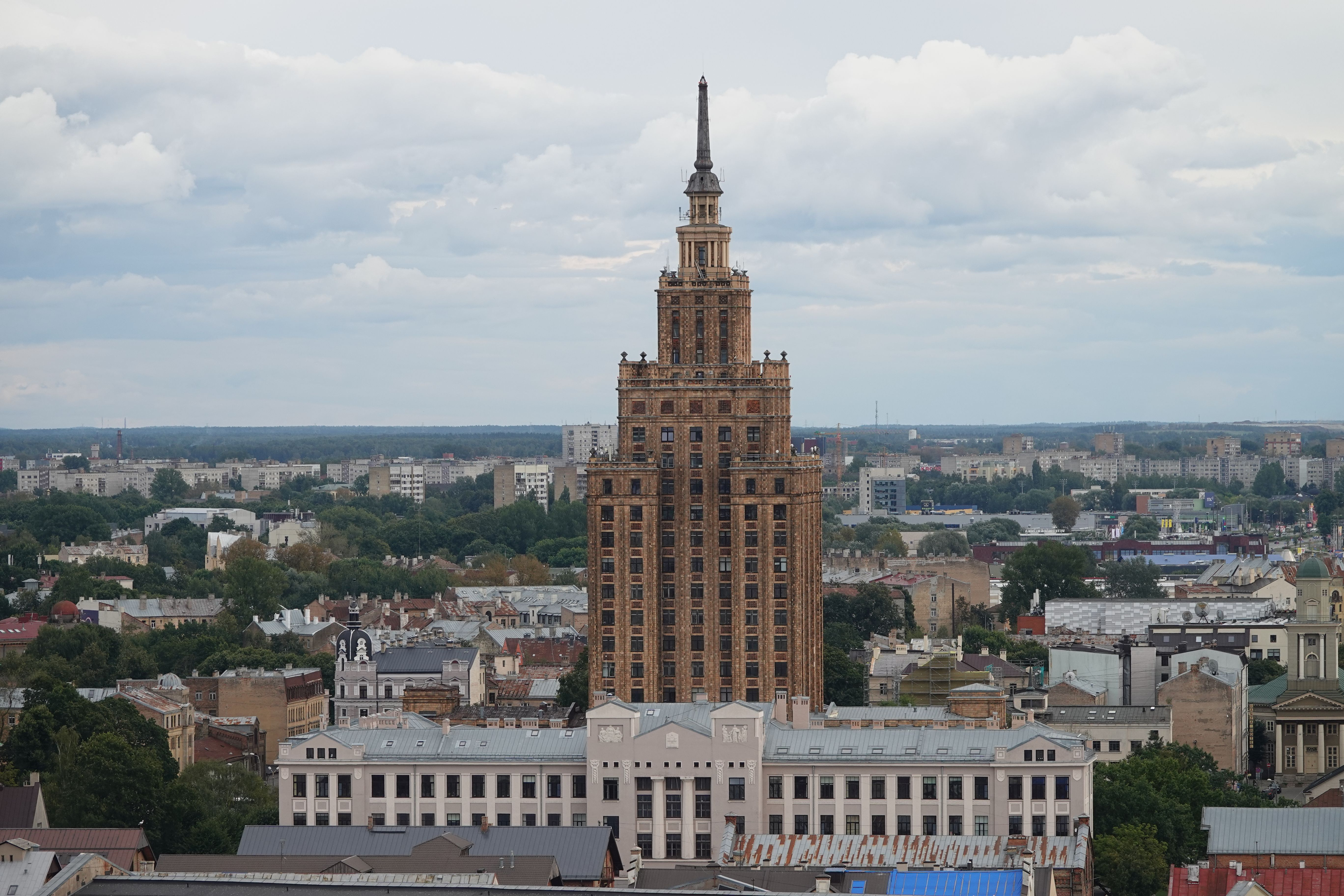
Aerial photograph of the Latvian Academy of Sciences

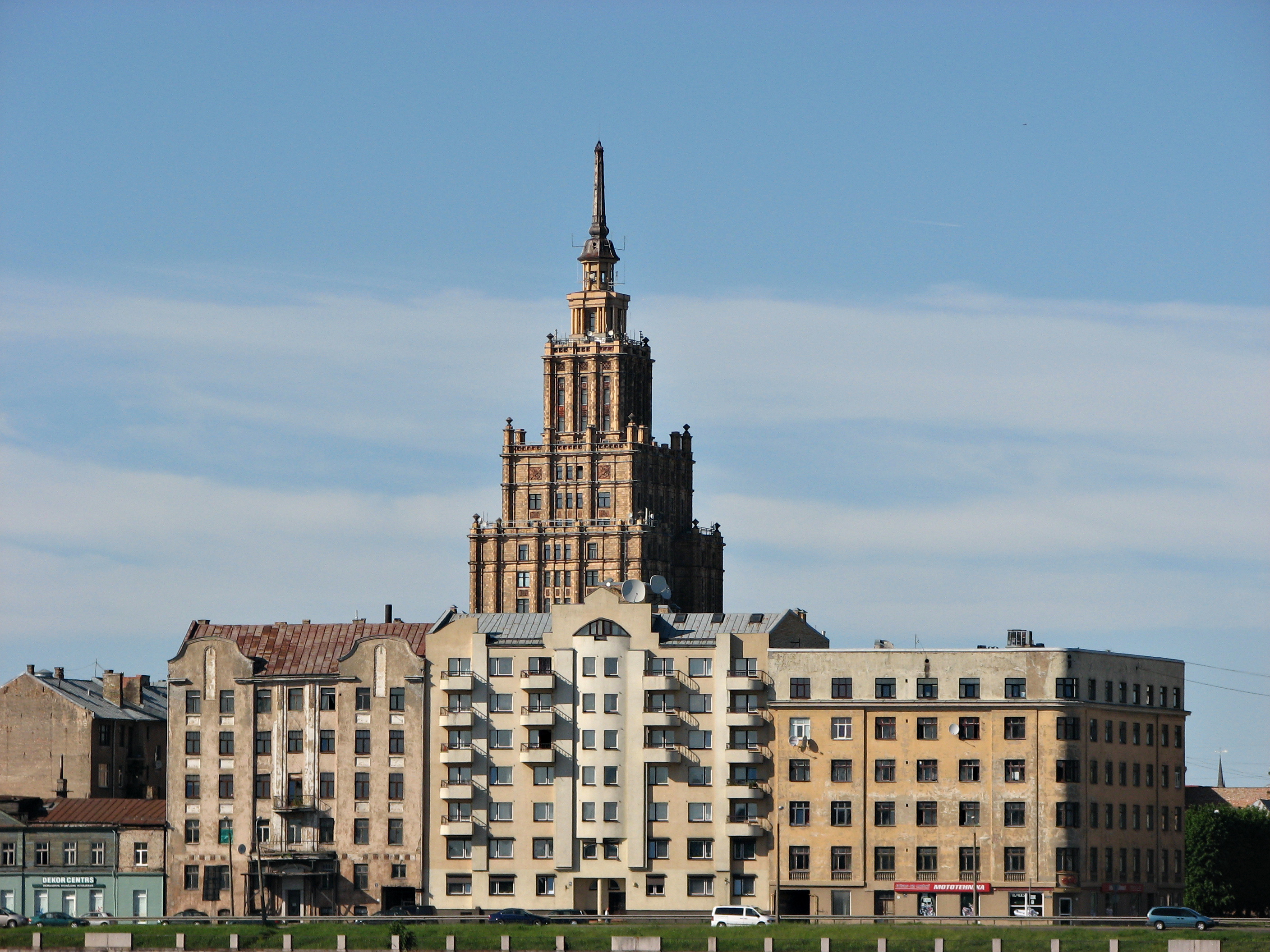
Panorama view of the academy

Street-level view of building

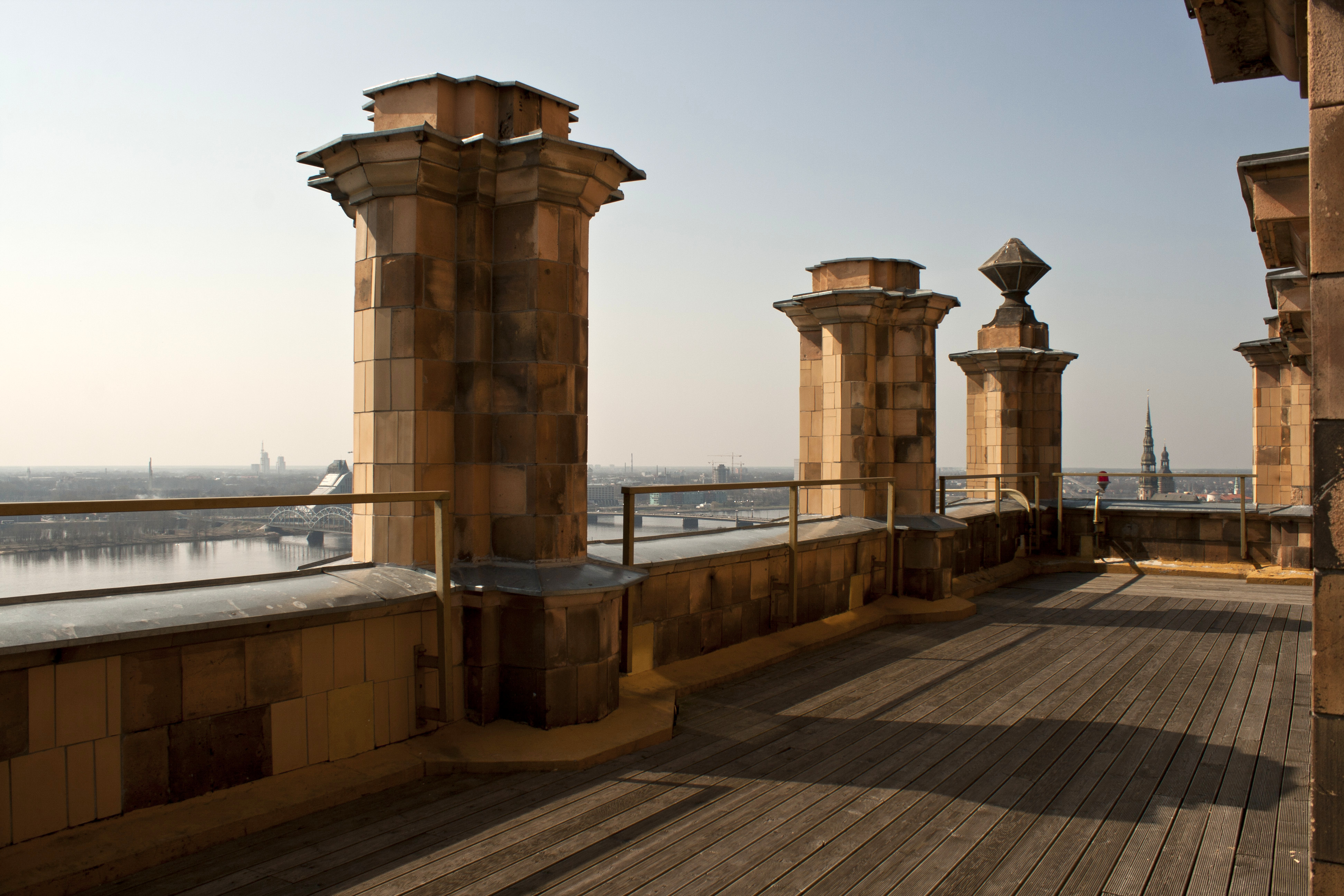
Panoramic deck

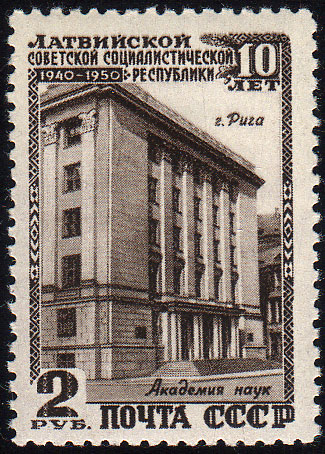
commemorative stamp (1950)

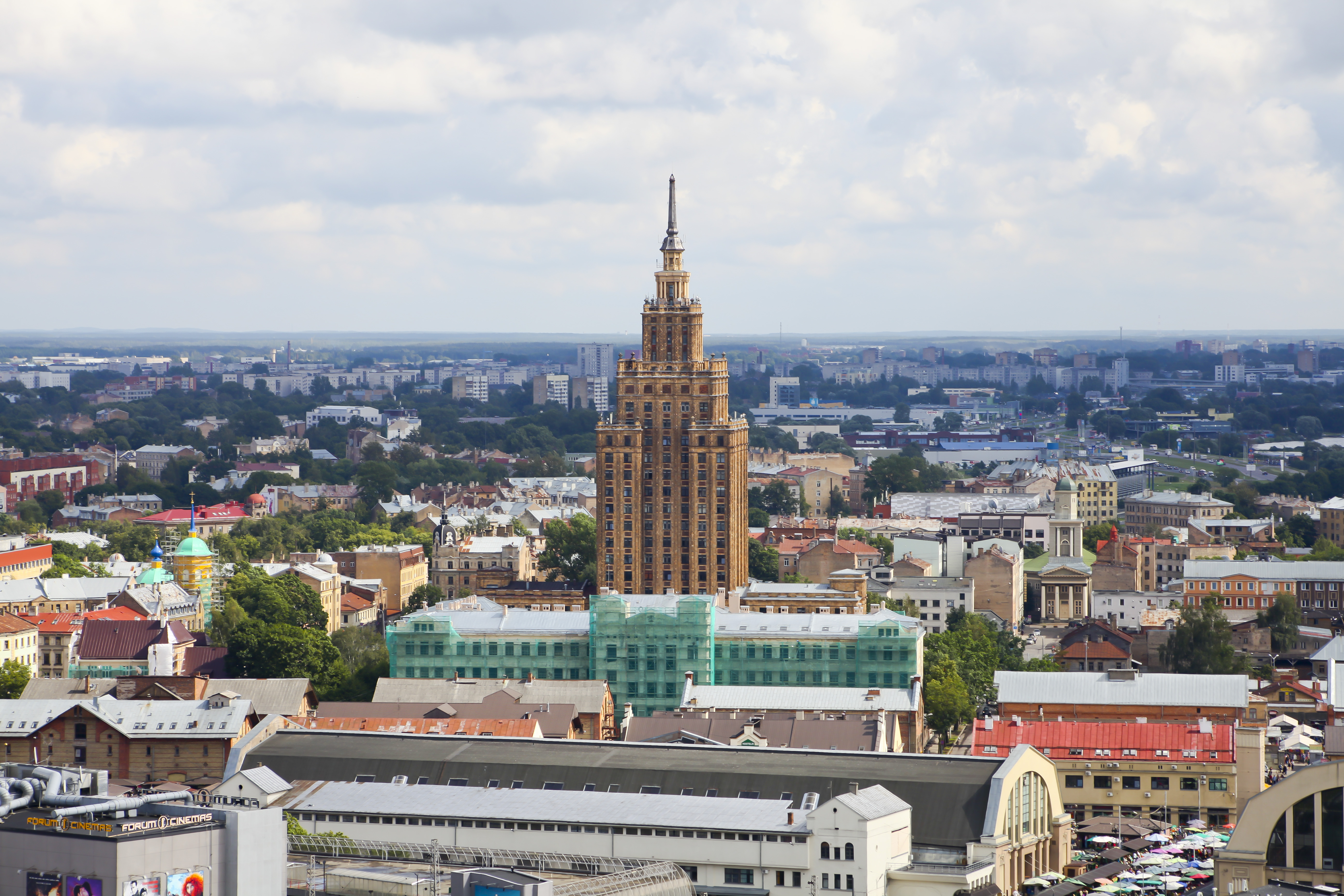
View of the academy in the skyline of Riga
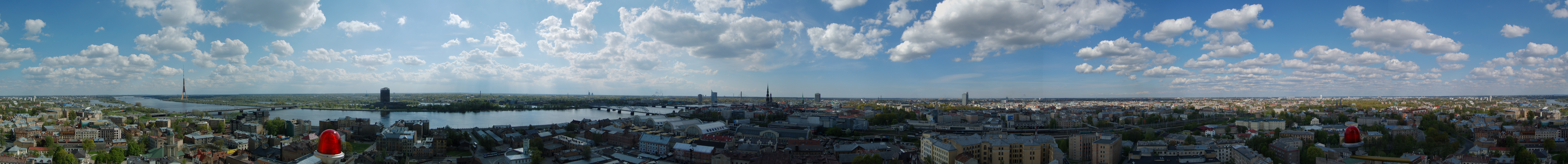
Panorama of Riga from the Latvian Academy of Sciences

== See also ==
- Stalinist skyscrapers, overview list: "Seven Sisters" in Moscow and similar ones elsewhere
