= Carnitine biosynthesis =

Carnitine biosynthesis is a method for the endogenous production of L-carnitine, a molecule that is essential for energy metabolism. In humans and many other animals, L-carnitine is obtained from both diet and by biosynthesis. The carnitine biosynthesis pathway is highly conserved among many eukaryotes and some prokaryotes.

L-Carnitine is biosynthesized from N^{ε}-trimethyllysine. At least four enzymes are involved in the overall biosynthetic pathway. They are N^{ε}-trimethyllysine hydroxylase, 3-hydroxy-N^{ε}-trimethyllysine aldolase, 4-N-trimethylaminobutyraldehyde dehydrogenase and γ-butyrobetaine hydroxylase.

== N^{ε}-Trimethyllysine hydroxylase ==
The first enzyme of the L-carnitine biosynthetic pathway is N^{ε}-trimethyllysine hydroxylase, an iron and 2-oxoglutarate (2OG)-dependent oxygenase that also requires ascorbate. N^{ε}-trimethyllysine hydroxylase catalyses the hydroxylation reaction of N^{ε}-trimethyllysine to 3-hydroxy-N^{ε}-trimethyllysine.

The current consensus theory about the origin of N^{ε}-trimethyllysine in mammals is that mammals utilise lysosomal or proteasomal degradation of proteins containing N^{ε}-trimethyllysine residues as starting point for carnitine biosynthesis. An alternative theory involving endogenous non-peptidyl biosynthesis was also proposed, based on evidence gathered from a study involving feeding normal and undernourished human subjects with the amino acid lysine. Although N^{ε}-trimethyllysine biosynthetic pathway involving N^{ε}-trimethyllysine methyltransferase has been fully characterised in fungi including Neurospora crassa, such biosynthetic pathway has never been properly characterised in mammals or humans. A third theory about the origin of N^{ε}-trimethyllysine in mammals does not involve biosynthesis at all, but involves direct dietary intake from vegetable foods. High-performance liquid chromatography (HPLC) analysis has confirmed that vegetables contain a significant amount of N^{ε}-trimethyllysine.

== 3-Hydroxy-N^{ε}-trimethyllysine aldolase ==
The second step of L-carnitine biosynthesis requires the 3-hydroxy-N^{ε}-trimethyllysine aldolase enzyme. 3-hydroxy-N^{ε}-trimethyllysine aldolase is a pyridoxal phosphate dependent aldolase, and it catalyses the cleavage of 3-hydroxy-N^{ε}-trimethyllysine into 4-N-trimethylaminobutyraldehyde and glycine.

The true identity of 3-hydroxy-N^{ε}-trimethyllysine aldolase is elusive and the mammalian gene encoding 3-hydroxy-N^{ε}-trimethyllysine aldolase has not been identified. 3-hydroxy-N^{ε}-trimethyllysine aldolase activity has been demonstrated in both L-threonine aldolase and serine hydroxymethyltransferase, although whether this is the main catalytic activity of these enzymes remains to be established.

== 4-N-Trimethylaminobutyraldehyde dehydrogenase ==
The third enzyme of L-carnitine biosynthesis is 4-N-trimethylaminobutyraldehyde dehydrogenase. 4-N-trimethylaminobutyraldehyde dehydrogenase is a NAD^{+} dependent enzyme. 4-N-trimethylaminobutyraldehyde dehydrogenase catalyses the dehydrogenation of 4-N-trimethylaminobutyraldehyde into gamma-butyrobetaine.

Unlike 3-hydroxy-N^{ε}-trimethyllysine aldolase, 4-N-trimethylaminobutyraldehyde dehydrogenase has been identified and purified from many sources including rat and Pseudomonas. However, the human 4-N-trimethylaminobutyraldehyde dehydrogenase has so far not been identified. There is considerable sequence similarity between rat 4-N-trimethylaminobutyraldehyde dehydrogenase and human aldehyde dehydrogenase 9, but the true identity of 4-N-trimethylaminobutyraldehyde dehydrogenase remains to be established.

== γ-Butyrobetaine hydroxylase ==
The final step of L-carnitine biosynthesis is γ-butyrobetaine hydroxylase, a zinc binding enzyme. Like N^{ε}-trimethyllysine hydroxylase, γ-butyrobetaine hydroxylase is a 2-oxoglutarate and iron(II)-dependent oxygenase. γ-Butyrobetaine hydroxylase catalyses the stereospecific hydroxylation of γ-butyrobetaine to L-carnitine.

γ-Butyrobetaine hydroxylase is the most studied enzyme among the four enzymes in the biosynthetic pathway. It has been purified from many sources, such as Pseudomonas, rat, cow, guinea pig and human. Recombinant human γ-butyrobetaine hydroxylase has also been produced by Escherichia coli and baculoviruses systems.

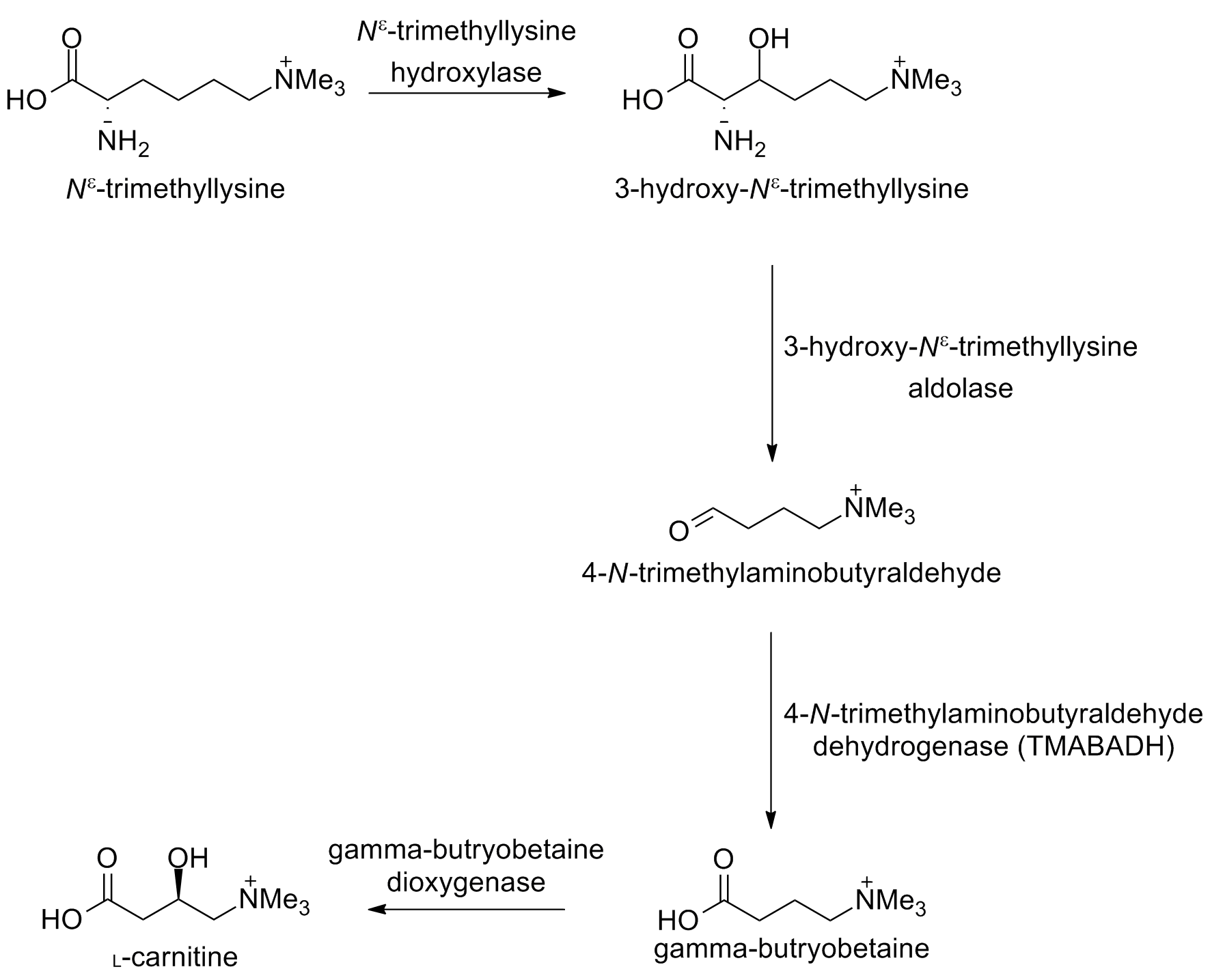
Scheme describing the biosynthetic pathway of L-carnitine in humans.
