= Threonine aldolase =

Class of enzymes

threonine aldolase
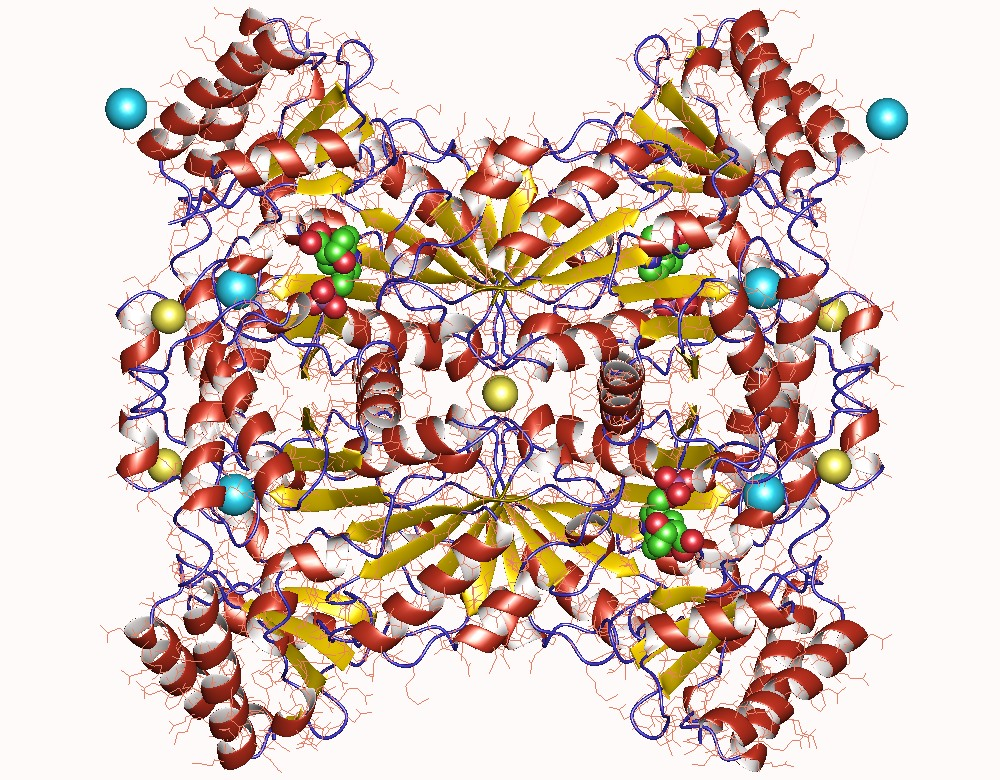
- L-Threonine aldolase homotetramer, Thermotoga maritima

Identifiers
- EC no.: 4.1.2.5
- CAS no.: 62213-23-4

Databases
- BRENDA: enzyme data
- ExPASy: NiceZyme view
- KEGG: enzyme entry
- MetaCyc: metabolic pathway
- Rhea: reactions
- PDB structures: RCSB PDB PDBe PDBsum
- Gene Ontology: AmiGO / QuickGO
Search
- PMC: articles
- PubMed: articles
- NCBI: proteins

The enzyme threonine aldolase (EC 4.1.2.5) is an enzyme not found in humans that catalyzes the chemical reaction

L-threonine $\rightleftharpoons$ glycine + acetaldehyde

This enzyme belongs to the family of lyases, specifically the aldehyde-lyases, which cleave carbon-carbon bonds. The systematic name of this enzyme class is L-threonine acetaldehyde-lyase (glycine-forming). This enzyme is also called L-threonine acetaldehyde-lyase. This enzyme participates in glycine, serine and threonine metabolism. It employs one cofactor, pyridoxal phosphate.

== Structural studies ==
As of late 2007, 5 structures have been solved for this class of enzymes, with PDB accession codes PDB: 1JG8, PDB: 1LW4, PDB: 1LW5, PDB: 1M6S, and PDB: 1SVV.

== Presence in human and mouse ==
THA1P

Identifiers
- Aliases: THA1P, GLY1, threonine aldolase 1, pseudogene
- External IDs: GeneCards: THA1P
Orthologs
Databases	NCBI: entry; OMA: entry
Species	Human	Mouse
Entrez	390816	n/a
Ensembl	ENSG00000267676	n/a
UniProt	n a	n/a
RefSeq (mRNA)	n/a	n/a
RefSeq (protein)	n/a	n/a
Location (UCSC)	n/a	n/a
PubMed search		n/a
- Wikidata
View/Edit Human

Some early evidence from 2005 suggests that the mouse ortholog enzyme, Tha1 (or GLY1), is synthesized and functional in mice, but this has not been reviewed by certain major groups like UniProt (as of August 2026).

Humans also have the remnants of the gene denoted THA1P (or GLY1), however it seems to be damaged by past mutations and inactive. RNA expression has not been found in major databases, suggesting that it isn't transcribed. Moreover, the pseudogene contains two single nucleotide deletions which would cause frameshifts even if were to be transcribed.
