= Carnitine-acylcarnitine translocase =

Mammalian protein found in Homo sapiens

SLC25A20

Identifiers
- Aliases: SLC25A20, CAC, CACT, Carnitine-acylcarnitine translocase, solute carrier family 25 member 20
- External IDs: OMIM: 613698; MGI: 1928738; GeneCards: SLC25A20

Gene location (Human)
Chr.	Chromosome 3 (human)
Band	3p21.31	Start	48,856,926 bp
Band	3p21.31	End	48,898,904 bp

Gene location (Mouse)
Chr.	Chromosome 9 (mouse)
Band	9|9 F2	Start	108,539,287 bp
Band	9|9 F2	End	108,561,840 bp
RNA expression pattern
Bgee	Human / Mouse (ortholog); Top expressed in: right lobe of liver; mucosa of transverse colon; apex of heart; mucosa of ileum; granulocyte; left ventricle; gastrocnemius muscle; duodenum; jejunal mucosa; muscle of thigh / Top expressed in: brown adipose tissue; tunica adventitia of aorta; interventricular septum; intercostal muscle; soleus muscle; myocardium of ventricle; thoracic diaphragm; left lobe of liver; right ventricle; extraocular muscle; More reference expression data
BioGPS	n/a
Gene ontology
Molecular function	acyl carnitine transmembrane transporter activity; carnitine:acyl carnitine antiporter activity; carnitine transmembrane transporter activity; transmembrane transporter activity
Cellular component	membrane; mitochondrion; cytosol; mitochondrial inner membrane; integral component of membrane
Biological process	carnitine shuttle; acyl carnitine transmembrane transport; mitochondrial transport; carnitine transport; carnitine transmembrane transport; transport
Sources:Amigo / QuickGO
Orthologs
Databases	NCBI: entry; OMA: entry
Species	Human	Mouse
Entrez	788	57279
Ensembl	ENSG00000178537	ENSMUSG00000032602
UniProt	O43772	Q9Z2Z6
RefSeq (mRNA)	NM_000387	NM_020520
RefSeq (protein)	NP_000378	NP_065266
Location (UCSC)	Chr 3: 48.86 – 48.9 Mb	Chr 9: 108.54 – 108.56 Mb
PubMed search
- Wikidata
View/Edit Human	View/Edit Mouse

solute carrier family 25 (carnitine/acylcarnitine translocase), member 20

Identifiers
- Symbol: SLC25A20
- Alt. symbols: CACT
- NCBI gene: 788
- HGNC: 1421
- OMIM: 212138
- RefSeq: NM_000387
- UniProt: O43772

Other data
- Locus: Chr. 3 p21.31
Search for
- Structures: Swiss-model
- Domains: InterPro

Carnitine-acylcarnitine translocase (CACT) is responsible for passive transport of carnitine and carnitine-fatty acid complexes and across the inner mitochondrial membrane as part of the carnitine shuttle system.

== Function ==
Fatty acyl–carnitine can diffuse from the cytosol across the porous outer mitochondrial membrane to the intermembrane space, but must utilize CACT to cross the nonporous inner mitochondrial membrane and reach the mitochondrial matrix. CACT is a cotransporter, returning one molecule of carnitine from the matrix to the intermembrane space as one molecule of fatty acyl–carnitine moves into the matrix.

== Clinical significance ==
A disorder is associated with carnitine-acylcarnitine translocase deficiency. This disorder disrupts the carnitine shuttle system from moving fatty acids across the mitochondrial membrane, leading to a decrease in fatty acid catabolism. The result is an accumulation of fatty acid within muscles and liver, decreased tolerance to long term exercise, inability to fast for more than a few hours, muscle weakness and wasting, and a strong acidic smell on the breath (due to protein catabolism).

Acyl-CoA from cytosol to the mitochondrial matrix
