= Grindeks =

Company based in Riga, Latvia

AS Grindex

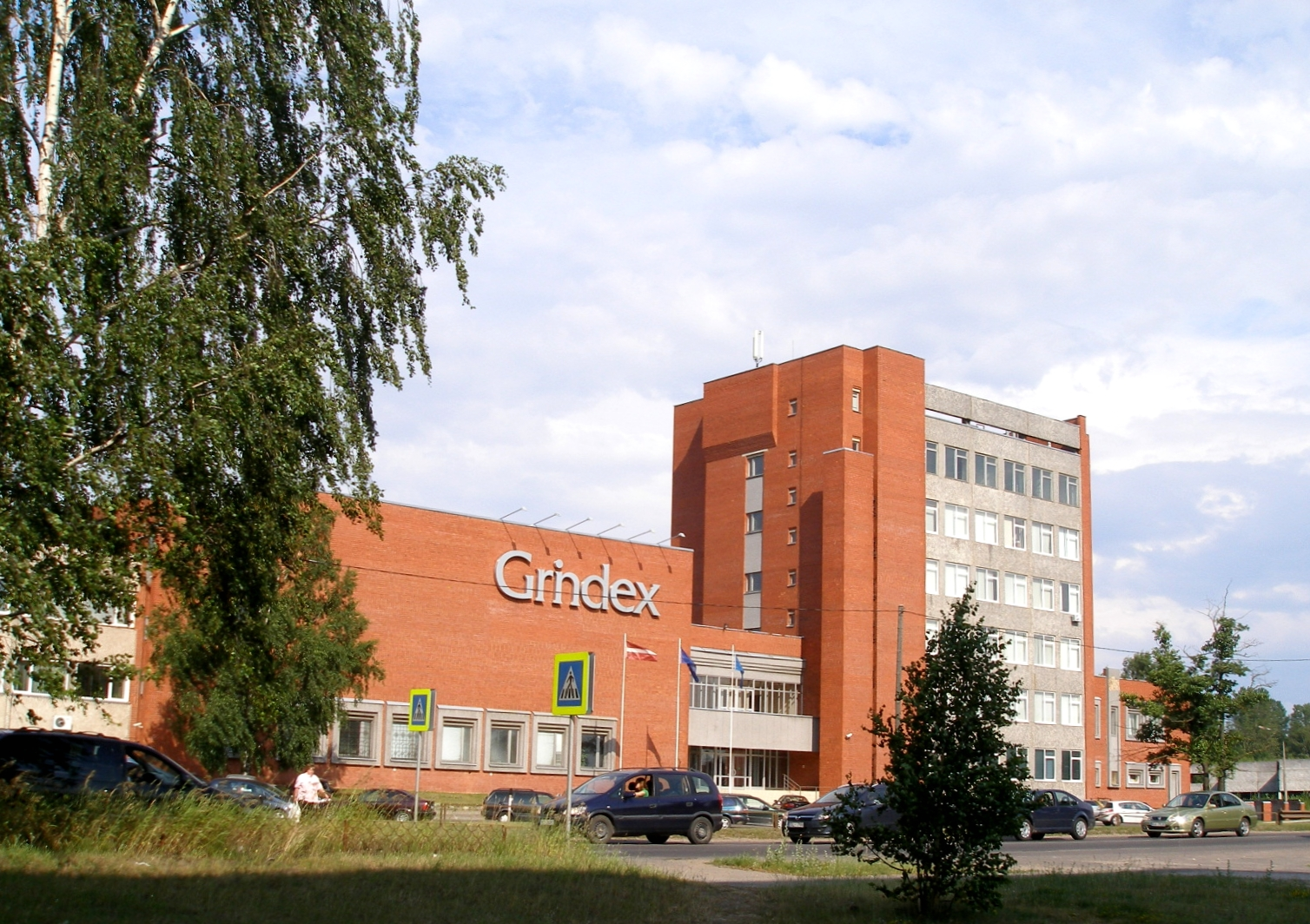
- Trade name: Grindex
- Industry: Pharmaceuticals
- Founded: 1946
- Headquarters: 53 Krustpils St, Riga, Latvia
- Key people: Kirovs Lipmans(Chairman of the Council), Janis Romanovskis (CEO)
- Products: Mildronate; Ftorafur
- Production output: Pharmaceuticals
- Revenue: 187 million EUR (2020)
- Net income: 29,142,630 (2022)
- Total assets: 198,324,446 euro (2022)
- Owner: Liplat Holding, Ltd.
- Number of employees: 1498 (2021)
- Subsidiaries: JSC Kalceks, JSC Tallinn Pharmaceutical Plant, HBM Pharma Ltd.
- Website: www.grindeks.eu

JSC Grindex (branded as Grindex), or simply Grindeks, is an internationally operating Latvian pharmaceutical company with headquarters in Riga, Latvia. Its portfolio consists of original products, generics, and active pharmaceutical ingredients. It mostly focuses on cardiovascular, central nervous system, anti-cancer, and diabetes medicines. Grindex is the leading pharmaceutical manufacturer in the Baltic States. In 2021, Grindex exported products to more than 90 countries.

Grindex Group consists of JSC Grindex and its four subsidiaries — JSC Kalceks (Latvia), HBM Pharma Ltd. (Slovakia), JSC Tallinn Pharmaceutical Plant (Estonia) and Namu apsaimniekošanas projekti Ltd. (Latvia).

== History ==
=== 1946–1990 ===
- Grindex was founded in 1946 when its predecessor, the Vitamin and Hormones Plant, was transformed into an experimental plant to produce medicines.
- In 1957, the Vitamin and Hormones Plant became part of the newly established Organic Synthesis Institute (OSI). The plant was developed as the OSI's experimental base for the implementation of fundamental research and scientific innovations in manufacturing.
- By the end of the 1950s, the manufacture of the first chemical products - fenilin, furazolidone, furadonin, and TioTEFA had begun. Work begins on the development of anti-cancer agents.
- The manufacture of final dosage forms and a circuit for tablets was established.
- In 1966, manufacturing technology for the anti-cancer product's active ingredients – Ftorafur® – was carried out.
- In 1965, the plant shifted to exclusively manufacturing organic synthetic products. In total, around 30 different medicines and related technologies were invented during the 1960s.
- In 1972, the first cooperation contracts were signed with Japanese pharmaceutical companies Iskra Industry and Taiho Pharmaceutical to supply the anti-cancer agent Ftorafur® and it spreads the fame of the plant worldwide. Even today, this drug is still one of the most exported products by Grindeks.
- The synthesis of Grindeks’ brand product Mildronate® commenced.
- In the 1980s, every fourth new medicinal drug in the former USSR was created by the OSI and developed at its Experimental Plant. More than 60 new medicines were created, of which 17 were patented and original to the plant.

=== 1991–2000 ===
- In 1991, along with the regaining of Latvian national independence, the Latvian State medicinal drug research, and manufacturing company Grindeks was founded based on the Experimental Plant. The name of the company emanates from the name of the first pharmacist, natural scientist, doctor, and Professor of Chemistry of Latvian origin, Davids Hieronims Grindelis.
- In 1997, the public Joint Stock Company Grindeks was established.
- In March 1998, Public Joint Stock Company Grindeks acquired a majority shareholding in the Tallinn Pharmaceutical Plant.
- The quotation of Grindeks shares on the Riga Stock Exchange commenced on 1 June 1998.
- In 2000, Grindeks received the Good Manufacturing Practice (GMP) certificate issued by the United Kingdom's Medicine Control Agency, which certifies the compliance of the company's tablet and capsule plant to the international requirements of pharmaceutical manufacturing.

=== 2001–2010 ===
- In 2003 Grindeks became the first Latvian pharmaceutical manufacturer to receive the Good Manufacturing Practice Certificate from the Latvian State Agency of Medicines.
- In 2001, Grindeks implements the principles of the ISO 9001:2000 quality standard.
- In September, the company received the International Environment Authority's ISO 14001:1996 certificate.
- In November, the US Food and Drug Administration recognized the compliance of the manufacturing and control of the active ingredient oxytocin to international standards.
- In 2002 the company signed up to the UN Global Compact and the global chemical industry's Responsible Care program.
- In 2007, Active Pharmaceutical Ingredients Analytical Scale-up Laboratory was opened, as well as Crystallization unit for Grindeks brand product Mildronate® substance was built with a capacity of 250 tons per year.
- In 2009, new, compliant to the international pharmaceutical industry standards, final dosage forms plant was opened.

=== 2011 – present ===
- In 2011, Grindeks established a new anti-cancer manufacturing unit. In 2011, Grindeks also unveiled UDCA active pharmaceutical ingredient manufacturing unit.
- In 2012, Grindeks unveiled an ointment and gel manufacturing unit, one of the most modern in the Baltic States. In 2011, Grindeks established a new anti-cancer manufacturing unit.
- In 2012, Grindeks agreed on the acquisition of whole (100%) shares of HBM Pharma s.r.o. in Slovakia.
- In 2013, Grindeks received OHSAS 18001 certification and the Russian ГОСТ (GOST) certification of quality ISO 9001-2011.
- 2020 Grindeks announces the plans to build a new multifunctional plant.

== Corporate governance and management ==
=== Supervisory Council ===
The supervisory Council of Grindeks consists of five members.

The chairman of the council is Kirovs Lipmans, who has taken the position of Grindeks since 2003. Other members of the Council of Grindeks include Anna Lipmane, Filips Lipmans, Arkadiy Vertkin, and Janis Naglis.

=== Board ===
Grindeks Board consists of chairman of the Board Janis Romanovskis.

=== Structure ===
==== Subsidiaries ====
- Grindeks Group consists of four subsidiaries:
- JSC Tallinn Pharmaceutical Plant, Estonia
- JSC Kalceks, Latvia
- Namu apsaimniekosanas projekti, Ltd., Latvia
- HBM PHARMA, Ltd., Slovakia

==== Offices ====
In 2021 "Grindeks" have 10 offices abroad — Lithuania, Estonia, Belarus, Ukraine, Azerbaijan, Georgia, Uzbekistan, Moldova, Kazakhstan, Kyrgyzstan.

=== Shareholders ===
Major shareholders — Liplat Holding, Ltd. owns 96.78% of "Grindeks" Group.

== Products ==
Grindeks' product portfolio consists of:

- original products and generic medications
- active pharmaceutical ingredients.

"Grindeks" specializes in therapeutic groups of medicines for the cardiovascular system, the central nervous system and anticancer medicines. In 2009, under the auspices of the Institute of Organic Synthesis of Latvia, independent researchers discovered a new cardioprotective substance GX-EG, which turned out to be 40 times more active than mildronate produced and exported by "Grindeks". The company has acquired the rights to conduct further research on GX-EG and will begin phase 1 clinical trials in 2020.

=== Branded and generic medications ===
==== Original products ====
- Ftorafur®
- Mildronate®

==== Generic ====
Grindeks manufactures over 60 final dosage form (FDF) pharmaceutical products and exports these to over 90 countries worldwide. The portfolio contains both original and generic FDF products. Grindeks' FDFs range from solid form products, solutions for injections to ointments and syrups.

===== Final dosage form =====
| Alprazolam | Clobetasol | Ketoconazole | Oxytocin | Terbinafine |
| Apixaban | Dapagliflozin | Lenalidomide | Pomalidomide | Ursodeoxycholic acid (UDCA) |
| Apremilast | Dexpanthenol | Lidocaine hydrocloride | Ranolazine | Venlafaxine |
| Betamethasone | Diazepam | Lisinopril | Rilmenidine | Warfarin |
| Betamethosone/Calcipotriol | Diclofenac gel | Loperamide | Risperidone | Zopiclone |
| Bisacodyl | Digoxin | Meldonium Phosphate (Mildronate®) | Rivaroxaban | |
| Bromhexine | Dimetindene | Memantine hydrochloride | Sitagliptin | |
| Bupivacaine hydrochloride | Eltrombopag | Methylprednisolone | Sitagliptin/Metformin | |
| Bupivacaine hydrochloride Heavy | Hydrocortisone | Mometasone | Sulpiride | |
| Carvedilol | Imatinib mesylate | Nilotinib | Tegafur (Ftorafur®) | |

===== Active pharmaceutical ingredients =====
| Alfentanil | Dexmedetomidine hydrochloride | Levosimendan | Nilotinib | Rivaroxaban | Xylazine |
| Atipamezole hydrochloride | Droperidol | Medetomidine hydrochloride | Oxytocin | Sufentanil | Xylazine hydrochloride |
| Desaminooxytocin | Fentanyl | Meldonium Phosphate (Mildronate®) | Remifentanil | Tegafur (Ftorafur®) | Zopiclone |
| Detomidine hydrochloride | Imatinib | Mivacurium chloride | Rilmenidine dihydrogen phosphate | Tioguanine | |

== Grindeks Group CDMO ==
Grindeks provides a wide range of development, analytical, and manufacturing services to support all stages of API and Final dosage form development – from early stages to GMP production. Grindeks and its subsidiaries hold MIA and GMP certificates, as well as authorizations for IMPs and controlled substances.

Grindeks has extensive experience in pharmaceutical product registration across a wide range of markets. Our company has successfully managed numerous Decentralised Procedures (DCP) and Mutual Recognition Procedures (MRP) within the European Union, consistently ensuring full regulatory compliance and efficient market access.

Beyond the EU, our company has substantial experience in obtaining marketing authorisations in Australia, Canada, Southeast Asia, the Middle East, and CIS countries. Our deep understanding of regional regulatory frameworks enables the development and implementation of effective registration strategies tailored to each specific market.

With comprehensive regulatory knowledge, our company manages every stage of the registration process – from initial planning to final approval – demonstrating excellence and reliability in pharmaceutical registration worldwide.

== Corporate social responsibility ==
Corporate social responsibility is an important element of Grindeks development. Additionally, to the annual business objectives, Grindeks has set a target to improve the company's activity in the corporate social responsibility area. The company has defined, that three key priorities of corporate social responsibility are:

- health and safety - comprising both patients and employees;
- environment protection;
- ethics, demonstrating Grindeks ability to act fairly in the multifaceted pharmaceutical business.

== Financial results ==
=== 2020 ===
In 2020 the Grindeks Group achieved historically the sharpest increase in turnover and profit. Turnover of the Grindeks Group reached 187.0 million euros. It is which is 45.6 million euros or 32% more than in 2019. Profit amounted to 19.0 million euro, which is 5.6 million euros or 42% more than in 2019.

The sales volume of the Group's final dosage forms in 2020 was 173.6 million euros and has increased compared to 2019 by 41.5 million euros or by 31%. In 2020 the sales volume of the active pharmaceutical ingredients amounted to 12.5 million euro, which is 3.9 million euros or 46% more than in 2019

In 2020 the Grindeks Group has strengthened its positions in the global pharmaceutical market and exported its products to 93 countries for the total amount of 176.1 million euros.

=== 2021 ===
The consolidated, provisional financial data of Grindeks Group shows that in the first half of 2021 the Group has reached record high turnover and profit. In this period the turnover of Grindeks Group reached 115,6 million euros, which is 21,1 million euros or 22% more than in the first half of 2020. The profit of the Group in the first half of 2021 amounted to 19,8 million euros, which are 7 million euros or 55% more than in the first half of 2020.

Grindeks Group's record-high profit and turnover have been achieved due to a significant increase in demand for the cardiovascular, central nervous system, and hospital segment medicines produced by the Group, as well as the hospital segment offered by JSC Grindeks subsidiary company JSC Kalceks.

During the first half of 2021, the Group exported its products to 91 countries for a total amount of 109,6 million euros.
