= Ivars Kalviņš =

Latvian chemist (born 1947)

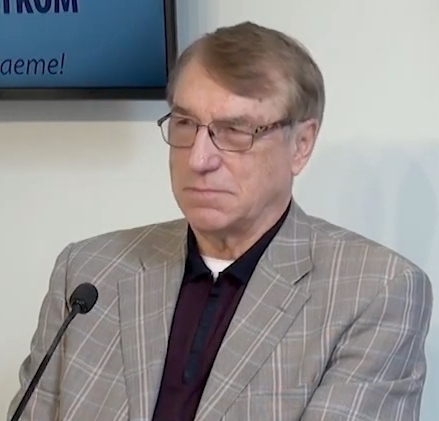
- Kalviņš in 2020
- Born: 2 June 1947 (age 79); Riga, Latvian SSR
- Education: University of Latvia
- Known for: meldonium
- Scientific career
- Fields: Chemistry
- Workplaces: Latvian Institute of Organic Synthesis

Ivars Kalviņš (born 2 June 1947) is a Latvian (and former Soviet Union) chemist who invented the prescription drug meldonium, trade-named Mildronate.

== Biography ==
In 1969 Kalviņš graduated from the Faculty of Chemistry, University of Latvia, and in 1985 defended a habilitation at the Saint Petersburg State University. Since 1986 he works at the Riga Institute of Organic Synthesis, which he headed in 2003–2014. Earlier between 1994 and 2000 he served as President of the Latvian Society of Chemistry.

Kalviņš was involved in the synthesis of several drugs, including meldonium, leakadin, neramexane, and belinostat.

== Awards and honors ==
Kalviņš is an Officer of Order of the Three Stars and since 1994 is a full member of the Latvian Academy of Sciences. He was awarded the State Prize of the Latvian SSR in 1988 and the Grand Medal of Academy of Sciences of Latvia in 2009. He was nominated as a finalist for the European Inventor Award 2015. As a member of a team of authors he received the "Annual Award in Science 2017" for the development of a new and promising compound E1R (methylphenylpiracetam) for improving memory and treating epilepsy. The E1R is the first known and published positive allosteric modulator of Sigma 1 receptor that improves memory processes and prevents seizures.
