= Alpha-ketoglutarate-dependent hydroxylases =

Class of enzymes

Alpha-ketoglutarate-dependent hydroxylases are a major class of non-heme iron proteins that catalyse a wide range of reactions. These reactions include hydroxylation reactions, demethylations, ring expansions, ring closures, and desaturations. Functionally, the αKG-dependent hydroxylases are comparable to cytochrome P450 enzymes. Both use O_{2} and reducing equivalents as cosubstrates and both generate water.

== Biological function ==
αKG-dependent hydroxylases have diverse roles. In microorganisms such as bacteria, αKG-dependent dioxygenases are involved in many biosynthetic and metabolic pathways; for example, in E. coli, the AlkB enzyme is associated with the repair of damaged DNA. In plants, αKG-dependent dioxygenases are involved in diverse reactions in plant metabolism. These include flavonoid biosynthesis, and ethylene biosyntheses. In mammals and humans, αKG-dependent dioxygenase have functional roles in biosyntheses (e.g. collagen biosynthesis and L-carnitine biosynthesis), post-translational modifications (e.g. protein hydroxylation), epigenetic regulations (e.g. histone and DNA demethylation), as well as sensors of energy metabolism.

Many αKG-dependent dioxygenase also catalyse uncoupled turnover, in which oxidative decarboxylation of αKG into succinate and carbon dioxide proceeds in the absence of substrate. The catalytic activity of many αKG-dependent dioxygenases are dependent on reducing agents (especially ascorbate) although the exact roles are not understood.

== Catalytic mechanism ==
αKG-dependent dioxygenases catalyse oxidation reactions by incorporating a single oxygen atom from molecular oxygen (O_{2}) into their substrates. This conversion is coupled with the oxidation of the cosubstrate αKG into succinate and carbon dioxide. With labeled O_{2} as substrate, the one label appears in the succinate and one in the hydroxylated substrate:

R_{3}CH + O_{2} + ^{−}O_{2}CC(O)CH_{2}CH_{2}CO_{2}^{−} → R_{3}COH + CO_{2} + ^{−}OOCCH_{2}CH_{2}CO_{2}^{−}

The first step involves the binding of αKG and substrate to the active site. αKG coordinates as a bidentate ligand to Fe(II), while the substrate is held by noncovalent forces in close proximity. Subsequently, molecular oxygen binds end-on to Fe cis to the two donors of the αKG. The uncoordinated end of the superoxide ligand attacks the keto carbon, inducing release of CO_{2} and forming an Fe(IV)-oxo intermediate. This Fe=O center then oxygenates the substrate by an oxygen rebound mechanism.

Alternative mechanisms have failed to gain support.

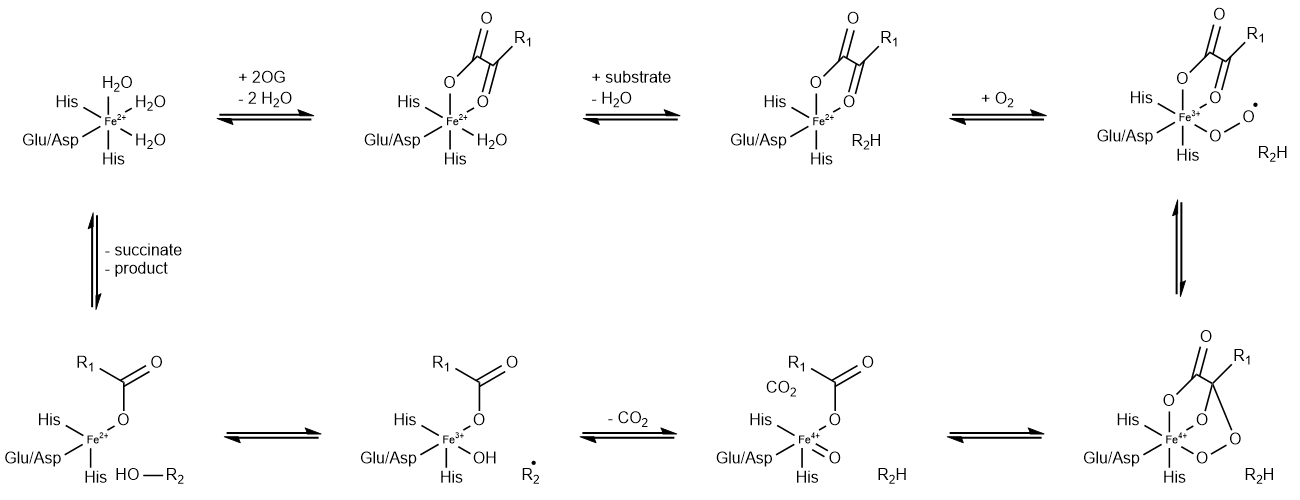
Consensus catalytic mechanism of the αKG-dependent dioxygenase superfamily.

== Structure ==
=== Protein ===
All αKG-dependent dioxygenases contain a conserved double-stranded β-helix (DSBH, also known as cupin) fold, which is formed with two β-sheets.

=== Metallocofactor ===
The active site contains a highly conserved 2-His-1-carboxylate (HXD/E...H) amino acid residue triad motif, in which the catalytically essential Fe(II) is held by two histidine residues and one aspartic acid/glutamic acid residue. The N_{2}O triad binds to one face of the Fe center, leaving three labile sites available on the octahedron for binding αKG and O_{2}. A similar facial Fe-binding motif, but featuring his-his-his array, is found in cysteine dioxygenase.

=== Substrate and cosubstrate binding ===
The binding of αKG and substrate has been analyzed by X-ray crystallography, molecular dynamics calculations, and NMR spectroscopy. The binding of the ketoglutarate has been observed using enzyme inhibitors.

Some αKG-dependent dioxygenases bind their substrate through an induced fit mechanism. For example, significant protein structural changes have been observed upon substrate binding for human prolyl hydroxylase isoform 2 (PHD2), a αKG-dependent dioxygenase that is involved in oxygen sensing, and isopenicillin N synthase (IPNS), a microbial αKG-dependent dioxygenase.

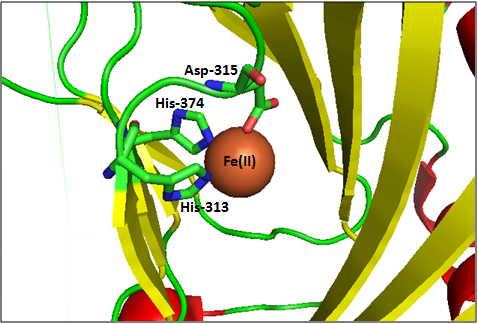
Simplified view of the active site of prolyl hydroxylase isoform 2 (PHD2), a human αKG-dependent dioxygenase. The Fe(II) is coordinated by two imidazoles and one carboxylate provided by the protein. Other ligands on iron, which are transiently occupied αKG and O_{2}, are omitted for clarity.

== Inhibitors ==
Given the important biological roles that αKG-dependent dioxygenase play, many αKG-dependent dioxygenase inhibitors were developed. The inhibitors that were regularly used to target αKG-dependent dioxygenase include N-oxalylglycine (NOG), pyridine-2,4-dicarboxylic acid (2,4-PDCA), 5-carboxy-8-hydroxyquinoline, FG-2216 and FG-4592, which were all designed mimic the co-substrate αKG and compete against the binding of αKG at the enzyme active site Fe(II). Although they are potent inhibitors of αKG-dependent dioxygenase, they lack selectivity and hence sometimes being referred to as so-called 'broad spectrum' inhibitors. Inhibitors that compete against the substrate were also developed, such as peptidyl-based inhibitors that target human prolyl hydroxylase domain 2 (PHD2) and Mildronate, a drug molecule that is commonly used in Russia and Eastern Europe that target gamma-butyrobetaine dioxygenase. Finally, as αKG-dependent dioxygenases require molecular oxygen as a co-substrate, it has also been shown that gaseous molecules such as carbon monoxide and nitric oxide are inhibitors of αKG-dependent dioxygenases, presumably by competing with molecular oxygen for the binding at the active site Fe(II) ion.

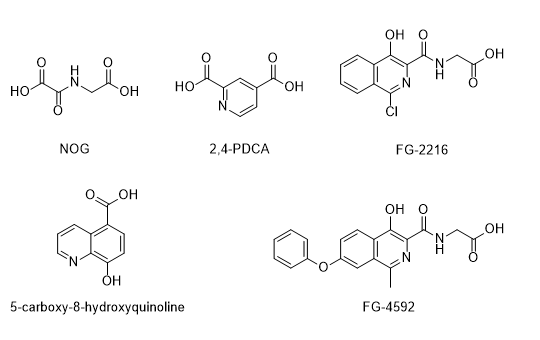
Common inhibitors of αKG-dependent dioxygenases. They compete against the cosubstrate αKG for binding to the active site Fe(II).

== Assays ==
Many assays were developed to study αKG-dependent dioxygenases so that information such as enzyme kinetics, enzyme inhibition and ligand binding can be obtained. Nuclear magnetic resonance (NMR) spectroscopy is widely applied to study αKG-dependent dioxygenases. For example, assays were developed to study ligand binding, enzyme kinetics, modes of inhibition as well as protein conformational change. Mass spectrometry is also widely applied. It can be used to characterise enzyme kinetics, to guide enzyme inhibitor development, study ligand and metal binding as well as analyse protein conformational change. Assays using spectrophotometry were also used, for example those that measure 2OG oxidation, co-product succinate formation or product formation. Other biophysical techniques including (but not limited to) isothermal titration calorimetry (ITC) and electron paramagnetic resonance (EPR) were also applied. Radioactive assays that uses ^{14}C labelled substrates were also developed and used. Given αKG-dependent dioxygenases require oxygen for their catalytic activity, oxygen consumption assay was also applied.
