= Gamma-butyrobetaine dioxygenase =

Protein-coding gene in the species Homo sapiens

BBOX1

Identifiers
- Aliases: BBOX1, BBH, BBOX, G-BBH, gamma-BBH, gamma-butyrobetaine hydroxylase 1
- External IDs: OMIM: 603312; MGI: 1891372; GeneCards: BBOX1
Available structures
PDB	Ortholog search: PDBe RCSB
PDB	List of PDB id codes 3MS5, 3N6W, 3O2G, 4BG1, 4BGK, 4BGM, 4BHF, 4BHG, 4BHI, 4C5W, 4C8R, 4CWD
Enzyme activity
EC #	BRENDA	ExPASy	KEGG	MetaCyc
1.14.11.1	↗	↗	↗	↗

Gene location (Human)
Chr.	Chromosome 11 (human)
Band	11p14.2	Start	27,040,725 bp
Band	11p14.2	End	27,127,809 bp

Gene location (Mouse)
Chr.	Chromosome 2 (mouse)
Band	2|2 E3	Start	110,093,042 bp
Band	2|2 E3	End	110,144,905 bp
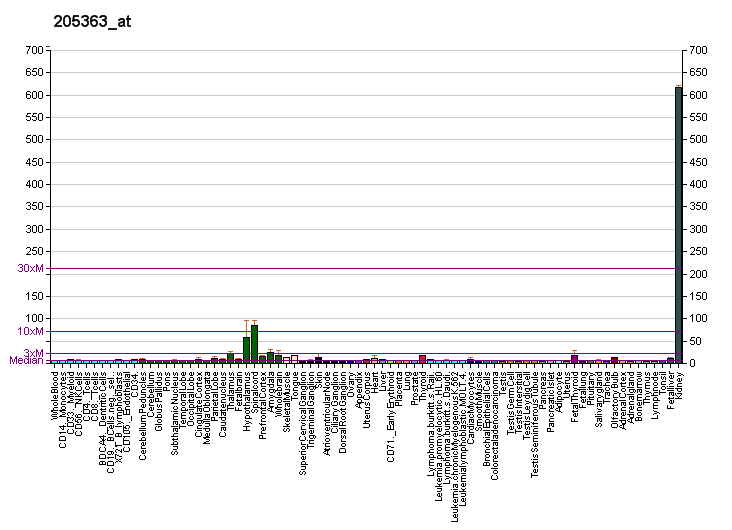
RNA expression pattern
Bgee	Human / Mouse (ortholog); Top expressed in: kidney tubule; glomerulus; human kidney; gingival epithelium; metanephric glomerulus; skin of thigh; renal medulla; skin of hip; external globus pallidus; skin of arm / Top expressed in: vestibular membrane of cochlear duct; left lobe of liver; skin of external ear; lumbar subsegment of spinal cord; lip; skin of back; deep cerebellar nuclei; epidermis; substantia nigra; hair follicle; More reference expression data
BioGPS	More reference expression data
Gene ontology
Molecular function	iron ion binding; oxidoreductase activity; zinc ion binding; protein binding; dioxygenase activity; metal ion binding; identical protein binding; gamma-butyrobetaine dioxygenase activity; oxidoreductase activity, acting on single donors with incorporation of molecular oxygen, incorporation of two atoms of oxygen
Cellular component	cytoplasm; cytosol; extracellular exosome; mitochondrion
Biological process	carnitine biosynthetic process
Sources:Amigo / QuickGO
Orthologs
Databases	NCBI: entry; OMA: entry
Species	Human	Mouse
Entrez	8424	170442
Ensembl	ENSG00000129151	ENSMUSG00000041660
UniProt	O75936	Q924Y0
RefSeq (mRNA)	NM_003986; NM_001376258; NM_001376259; NM_001376260; NM_001376261	NM_130452
RefSeq (protein)	NP_003977; NP_001363187; NP_001363188; NP_001363189; NP_001363190	NP_569719
Location (UCSC)	Chr 11: 27.04 – 27.13 Mb	Chr 2: 110.09 – 110.14 Mb
PubMed search
- Wikidata
View/Edit Human	View/Edit Mouse

Gamma-butyrobetaine dioxygenase (also known as BBOX, GBBH or γ-butyrobetaine hydroxylase) is an enzyme that in humans is encoded by the BBOX1 gene. Gamma-butyrobetaine dioxygenase catalyses the formation of L-carnitine from gamma-butyrobetaine, the last step in the L-carnitine biosynthesis pathway. Carnitine is essential for the transport of activated fatty acids across the mitochondrial membrane during mitochondrial beta oxidation. In humans, gamma-butyrobetaine dioxygenase can be found in the kidney (high), liver (moderate), and brain (very low). BBOX1 has recently been identified as a potential cancer gene based on a large-scale microarray data analysis.

== Reaction ==
gamma-butyrobetaine dioxygenase

Identifiers
- EC no.: 1.14.11.1
- CAS no.: 9045-31-2

Databases
- BRENDA: enzyme data
- ExPASy: NiceZyme view
- KEGG: enzyme entry
- MetaCyc: metabolic pathway
- Rhea: reactions
- PDB structures: RCSB PDB PDBe PDBsum
- Gene Ontology: AmiGO / QuickGO
Search
- PMC: articles
- PubMed: articles
- NCBI: proteins

Gamma-butyrobetaine dioxygenase belongs to the 2-oxoglutarate (2OG)-dependent dioxygenase superfamily. It catalyses a reaction which converts 4-trimethylammoniobutanoate (γ-butyrobetaine) into L-carnitine.:

γ-butyrobetaine
Fe(IV)=O
Fe(II)
carnitine

The enzyme is a non-heme iron protein with ferryl active site where Fe(IV)=O is the species that transfers its oxygen to the substrate. The mechanism of action requires 2-oxoglutaric acid to activate the iron oxygen complex, and this gives succinic acid and carbon dioxide when the second atom of the molecular oxygen is removed. Ascorbic acid and glutathione improve the turnover number of the enzyme. The catalytic activity of gamma-butyrobetaine dioxygenase can be stimulated with different metal ions, especially potassium ions.

2-oxoglutaric acid
[O]
CO_{2}
succinic acid

Both the apo (PDB id: 3N6W) and the holo (PDB id: 3O2G) structures of gamma-butyrobetaine dioxygenase have been solved, demonstrating an induced fit mechanism may contribute to the catalytic activity of gamma-butyrobetaine dioxygenase.

Gamma-butyrobetaine dioxygenase is promiscuous in substrate selectivity and it processes a number of modified substrates, including the natural catalytic products L-carnitine and D-carnitine, forming 3-dehydrocarnitine and trimethylaminoacetone. Gamma-butyrobetaine dioxygenase also catalyses the oxidation of mildronate to form multiple products including malonic acid semialdehyde, dimethylamine, formaldehyde and (1-methylimidazolidin-4-yl)acetic acid, which is proposed to be formed via a Stevens rearrangement mechanism. Gamma-butyrobetaine dioxygenase is unique among other human 2OG oxygenases that it catalyses both hydroxylation (e.g.: L-carnitine), demethylation (e.g.: formaldehyde) and C-C bond formation (e.g.: (1-methylimidazolidin-4-yl)acetic acid).

== Inhibition ==
Gamma-butyrobetaine dioxygenase is an inhibition target for 3-(2,2,2-trimethylhydraziniumyl)propionate (mildronate, also known as THP, MET-88, Meldonium or Quarterine). Mildronate is offered, clinically, to non-U.S. markets, in treatment of angina and myocardial infarction. Some studies suggested that mildronate may also be beneficial for the treatment of neurological disorder, diabetes, and seizures and alcohol intoxication. Mildronate is currently manufactured and marketed by Grindeks, a pharmaceutical company based in Latvia. To date, at least five clinical trial reports were published in peer-reviewed journals documenting the efficacy and safety of mildronate on the treatments of angina, stroke and chronic heart failure. However, there have been no randomized clinical trials to support the use of mildronate to treat any cardiovascular disease.

Mildronate has a similar structure to the natural substrate gamma-butyrobetaine, with a NH group replacing the CH_{2} of gamma-butyrobetaine at the C-4 position. A crystal structure of mldronate in complex with gamma-butyrobetaine dioxygenase was published, and it suggests mildronate bind to gamma-butyrobetaine dioxygenase in exactly the same way as gamma-butyrobetaine (PDB id: 3MS5). To date, most enzyme inhibitors for human 2OG oxygenases bind to the cosubstrate 2OG binding site; mildronate is a rare example of a non-peptidyl substrate mimic inhibitor. Although initial reports suggested mildronate is a non-competitive and non-hydroxylatable analogue of gamma-butyrobetaine, further studies have identified mildronate is indeed a substrate for gamma-butyrobetaine dioxygenase.

Similar to other 2OG oxygenases, gamma-butyrobetaine dioxygenase can be inhibited by 2OG mimics and aromatic inhibitors such as pyridine 2,4-dicarboxylate. Other reported gamma-butyrobetaine dioxygenase inhibitors include cyclopropyl-substituted gamma-butyrobetaines and 3-(2,2-dimethylcyclopropyl)propanoic acid, which is a mechanism-based enzyme inhibitor.

== Assay ==
Several in vitro biochemical assays have been applied to monitor the catalytic activity of gamma-butyrobetaine dioxygenase. Early methods have mainly focused on the use of radiolabeled compounds, including ^{14}C-labelled gamma-butyrobetaine and ^{14}C-labelled 2OG. Enzyme-coupled method have also been applied to detect carnitine formation, by using the enzyme carnitine acetyltransferase and ^{14}C-labelled acetyl-coenzyme A to give labelled acetylcarnitine for detection. Using this method, it is possible to detect carnitine concentration down to the pico-molar range. Other analytical methods including mass spectrometry and NMR have also been applied, and they are in particularly useful for the study of the coupling ratio between 2OG oxidation and substrate formation, and for the characterisation of unknown enzymatic products. However, these methods are often not suitable for high-throughput screening and require expensive instrumentation. A potentially high-throughput fluorescence-based assay has also been proposed by using a fluorinated-gamma-butyrobetaine analog. The fluoride ions released as a result of gamma-butyrobetaine dioxygenase catalyses can be detected by using chemosensors such as protected fluorescein.

== See also ==
- Carnitine
- Mildronate
- Carnitine biosynthesis
- Beta Oxidation
- Fatty acid metabolism
- Stevens rearrangement
