= Lipid metabolism =

Biological synthesis and degradation of lipids

Lipid metabolism is the synthesis and degradation of lipids in cells, involving the breakdown and storage of fats for energy and the synthesis of structural and functional lipids, such as those involved in the construction of cell membranes. In animals, these fats are obtained from food and are synthesized by the liver. Lipogenesis is the process of synthesizing these fats. The majority of lipids found in the human body from ingesting food are triglycerides and cholesterol. Other types of lipids found in the body are fatty acids and membrane lipids. Lipid metabolism is often considered the digestion and absorption process of dietary fat; however, there are two sources of fats that organisms can use to obtain energy: from consumed dietary fats and from stored fat. Vertebrates (including humans) use both sources of fat to produce energy for organs such as the heart to function. Since lipids are hydrophobic molecules, they need to be solubilized before their metabolism can begin. Lipid metabolism often begins with hydrolysis, which occurs with the help of various enzymes in the digestive system. Lipid metabolism also occurs in plants, though the processes differ in some ways when compared to animals. The second step after the hydrolysis is the absorption of the fatty acids into the epithelial cells of the intestinal wall. In the epithelial cells, fatty acids are packaged and transported to the rest of the body.

Metabolic processes include lipid digestion, lipid absorption, lipid transportation, lipid storage, lipid catabolism, and lipid biosynthesis. Lipid catabolism is accomplished by a process known as beta oxidation which takes place in the mitochondria and peroxisome cell organelles.

== Lipid digestion ==
Digestion is the first step to lipid metabolism, and it is the process of breaking the triglycerides down into smaller monoglyceride units with the help of lipase enzymes. Digestion of fats begin in the mouth through chemical digestion by lingual lipase. Ingested cholesterol is not broken down by the lipases and stays intact until it enters the epithelium cells of the small intestine. Lipids then continue to the stomach where chemical digestion continues by gastric lipase and mechanical digestion begins (peristalsis). The majority of lipid digestion and absorption, however, occurs once the fats reach the small intestines. Chemicals from the pancreas (pancreatic lipases and bile salt-dependent lipase) are secreted into the small intestines to help break down the triglycerides, along with further mechanical digestion, until the individual fatty acid units are able to be absorbed into the small intestine's epithelial cells.

== Lipid absorption ==
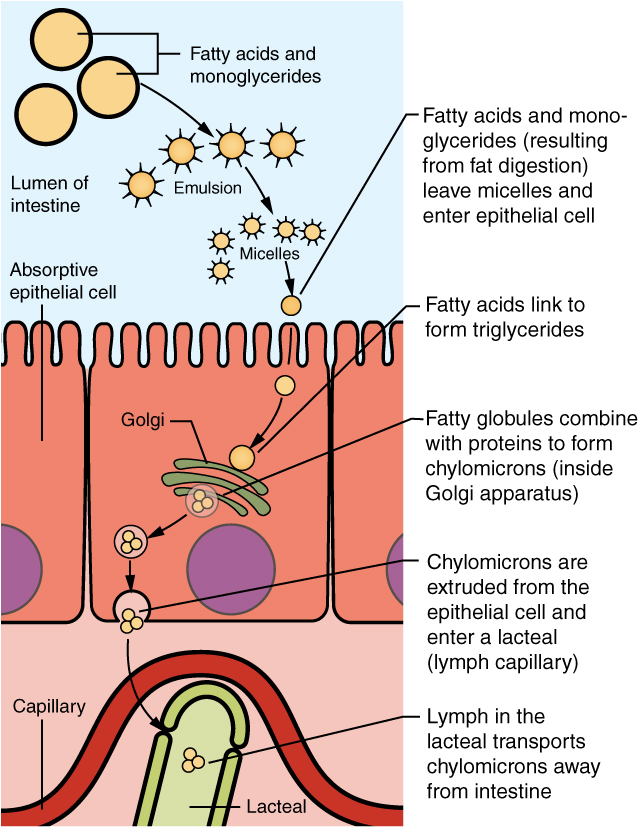
Flowchart showing the lipid absorption process

The second step in lipid metabolism is absorption of fats. Short chain fatty acids can be absorbed in the stomach, while most absorption of fats occurs only in the small intestines. Once the triglycerides are broken down into individual fatty acids and glycerols, along with cholesterol, they will aggregate into structures called micelles. Fatty acids and monoglycerides leave the micelles and diffuse across the membrane to enter the intestinal epithelial cells. In the cytosol of epithelial cells, fatty acids and monoglycerides are recombined back into triglycerides. In the cytosol of epithelial cells, triglycerides and cholesterol are packaged into bigger particles called chylomicrons which are amphipathic structures that transport digested lipids. Chylomicrons will travel through the bloodstream to enter adipose and other tissues in the body.

== Lipid transportation ==
Due to the hydrophobic nature of membrane lipids, triglycerides and cholesterol, they require special transport proteins known as lipoproteins. The amphipathic structure of lipoproteins allows the triglycerides and cholesterol to be transported through the blood. Chylomicrons are one sub-group of lipoproteins which carry the digested lipids from small intestine to the rest of the body. The varying densities between the types of lipoproteins are characteristic to what type of fats they transport. For example, very-low-density lipoproteins (VLDL) carry the triglycerides synthesized by our body and low-density lipoproteins (LDL) transport cholesterol to our peripheral tissues. A number of these lipoproteins are synthesized in the liver, but not all of them originate from this organ.

== Lipid storage ==
Lipids are stored in white adipose tissue as triglycerides. In a lean young adult human, the mass of triglycerides stored represents about 10–20 kilograms. Triglycerides are formed from a backbone of glycerol with three fatty acids. Free fatty acids are activated into acyl-CoA and esterified to finally reach the triglyceride droplet. Lipoprotein lipase has an important role.

== Lipid catabolism ==
Once the chylomicrons (or other lipoproteins) travel through the tissues, these particles will be broken down by lipoprotein lipase in the luminal surface of endothelial cells in capillaries to release triglycerides. Triglycerides are broken down into fatty acids and glycerol before entering cells and remaining cholesterol will again travel through the blood to the liver.

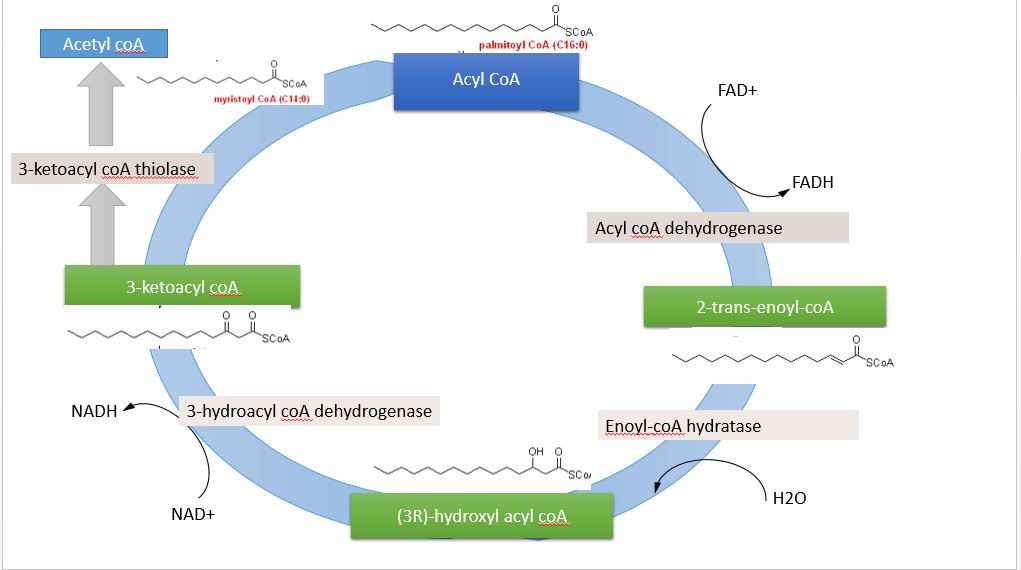
Breakdown of fatty acids by beta oxidation

In the cytosol of the cell (for example a muscle cell), the glycerol will be converted to glyceraldehyde 3-phosphate, which is an intermediate in the glycolysis, to get further oxidized and produce energy. However, the main steps of fatty acids catabolism occur in the mitochondria. Long chain fatty acids (more than 14 carbons) must be converted to fatty acyl-CoA in order to pass across the mitochondrial membrane. Fatty acid catabolism begins in the cytoplasm of cells as acyl-CoA synthetase uses the energy from cleavage of an ATP to catalyze the addition of coenzyme A to the fatty acid. The resulting acyl-CoA crosses the mitochondrial membrane to enter the process of beta oxidation. The main products of the beta oxidation pathway are acetyl-CoA (which is used in the citric acid cycle to produce energy), NADH and FADH. The process of beta oxidation requires the following enzymes: acyl-CoA dehydrogenase, enoyl-CoA hydratase, 3-hydroxyacyl-CoA dehydrogenase, and 3-ketoacyl-CoA thiolase. The diagram to the left shows how fatty acids are converted into acetyl-CoA.

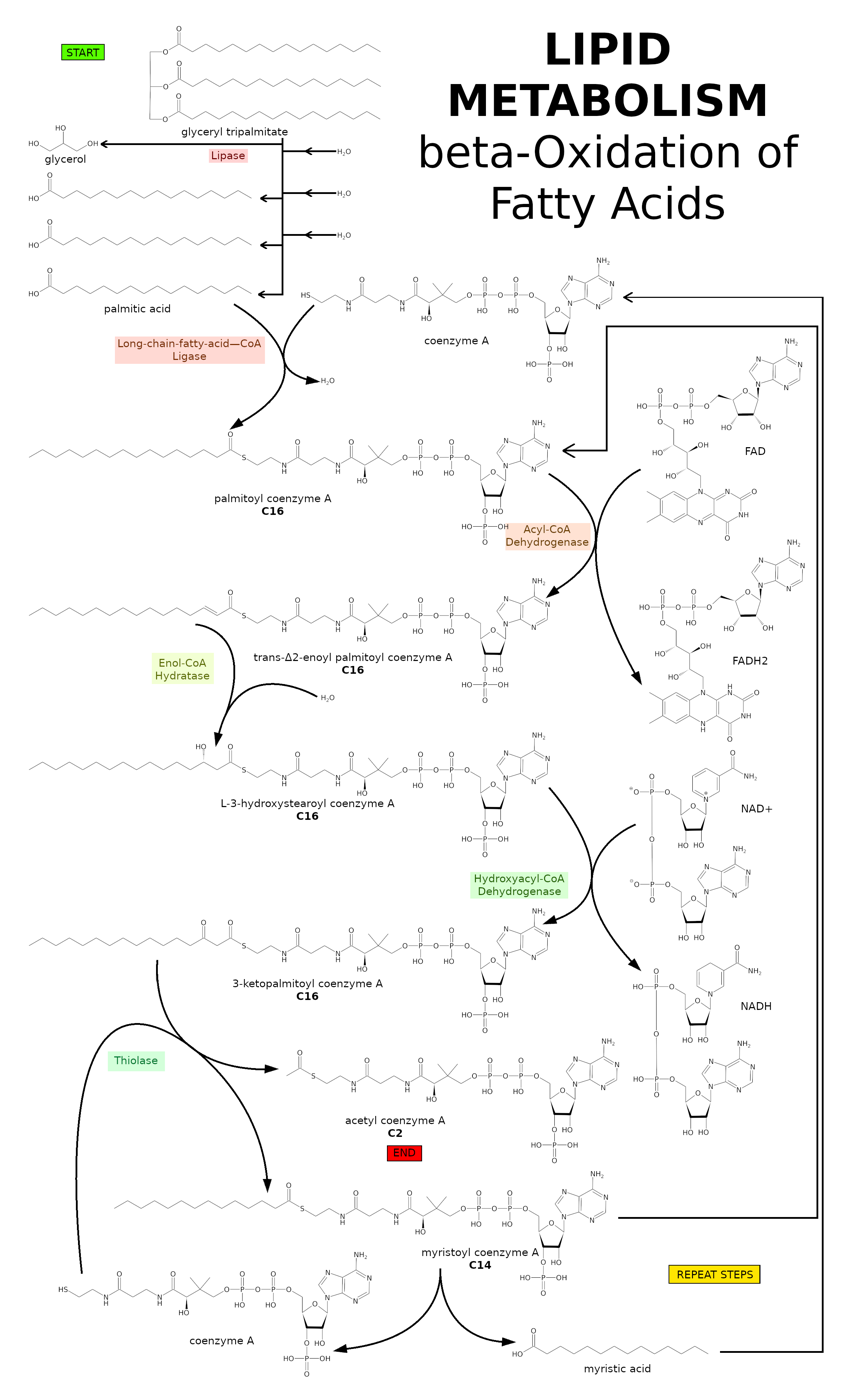
The beta-Oxidation cycle pathway diagram illustrates the metabolic reactions that allow for the breakdown of fatty acids into NADH and ATP, often taught in connection with the electron transport chain and ATP synthase.

The overall net reaction, using palmitoyl-CoA (16:0) as a model substrate is:

7 FAD + 7 NAD^{+} + 7 CoASH + 7 H_{2}O + H(CH_{2}CH_{2})_{7}CH_{2}CO-SCoA → 8 CH_{3}CO-SCoA + 7 FADH_{2} + 7 NADH + 7 H^{+}

== Lipid biosynthesis ==
In addition to dietary fats, storage lipids stored in the adipose tissues are one of the main sources of energy for living organisms. Triacylglycerols, lipid membrane, and cholesterol can be synthesized by the organisms through various pathways.

=== Membrane lipid biosynthesis ===
There are two major classes of membrane lipids: glycerophospholipids and sphingolipids. Although many different membrane lipids are synthesized in our body, pathways share the same pattern. The first step is synthesizing the backbone (sphingosine or glycerol), the second step is the addition of fatty acids to the backbone to make phosphatidic acid. Phosphatidic acid is further modified with the attachment of different hydrophilic head groups to the backbone. Membrane lipid biosynthesis occurs in the endoplasmic reticulum membrane.

=== Triglyceride biosynthesis ===
The phosphatidic acid is also a precursor for triglyceride biosynthesis. Phosphatidic acid phosphatase catalyzes the conversion of phosphatidic acid to diacylglyceride, which will be converted to triglycerides by acyltransferase. Triglyceride biosynthesis occurs in the cytosol.

=== Fatty acid biosynthesis ===
The precursor for fatty acids is acetyl-CoA and it occurs in the cytosol of the cell. The overall net reaction, using palmitate (16:0) as a model substrate is:

8 Acetyl-coA + 7 ATP + 14 NADPH + 6H+ → palmitate + 14 NADP+ + 6H2O + 7ADP + 7P¡

=== Cholesterol biosynthesis ===
Cholesterol can be made from acetyl-CoA through a multiple-step pathway known as isoprenoid pathway. Cholesterol is an essential compound because it is a precursor for sex hormones, such as progesterone. 70% of cholesterol biosynthesis occurs in the cytosol of liver cells.

== Hormonal regulation of lipid metabolism ==
Lipid metabolism is tightly regulated by hormones to ensure a balance between energy storage and utilization.

- Insulin: promotes lipid synthesis, inhibiting lipid breakdown, and facilitating glucose transport and conversion into fatty acids.
- Glucagon: stimulates fatty acid oxidation and inhibits de novo fatty acid synthesis, reducing VLDL release and hepatic steatosis.
- Thyroid Hormone: promotes hepatic triglyceride synthesis, enhancing lipolysis, stimulating mitochondrial fatty acid β-oxidation, and regulating cholesterol levels through various mechanisms, including LDL receptor expression and bile acid excretion.
- Sex Hormone:
  - Estrogen: decreases triglyceride synthesis and enhances HDL cholesterol levels, potentially through promoting fatty acid oxidation and inhibiting lipogenesis.
  - Testosterone: stimulates de novo lipogenesis and fat accumulation which are then incorporated to triglycerides for energy storage.
- Adrenaline: stimulates lipolysis and inhibits lipogenesis via AMPK phosphorylation, influencing lipid turnover and accumulation in adipose tissue.

== Lipid metabolism disorders ==
Lipid metabolism disorders (including inborn errors of lipid metabolism) are illnesses that disrupt normal processes in breaking down or synthesizing fats (or fat-like substances). Lipid metabolism disorders are associated with an increase in the concentrations of plasma lipids in the blood such as LDL cholesterol, VLDL, and triglycerides, which most commonly leads to cardiovascular diseases. Often these disorders are hereditary. Gaucher's disease (types I, II, and III), Niemann–Pick disease, Tay–Sachs disease, and Fabry's disease are all disorders of lipid metabolism. Rarer disorders of lipid metabolism include sitosterolemia, Wolman's disease, Refsum's disease, and cerebrotendinous xanthomatosis.

== Types of lipids ==
The types of lipids involved in lipid metabolism include:

- Membrane lipids:
  - Phospholipids: Phospholipids are a major component of the lipid bilayer of the cell membrane and are found in many parts of the body.
  - Sphingolipids: Sphingolipids are mostly found in the cell membrane of neural tissue.
  - Glycolipids: The main role of glycolipids is to maintain lipid bilayer stability and facilitate cell recognition.
  - Glycerophospholipids: Neural tissue (including the brain) contains high amounts of glycerophospholipids.
- Other types of lipids:
  - Cholesterol: Cholesterol is the main precursor for different hormones in our body such as progesterone and testosterone. The main function of cholesterol is controlling the cell membrane fluidity.
  - Steroid – see also steroidogenesis: Steroids are one of the important cell signaling molecules.
  - Triacylglycerols (fats) – see also lipolysis and lipogenesis: Triacylglycerols are the major form of energy storage in human body.
  - Fatty acids – see also fatty acid metabolism: Fatty acids are one of the precursors used for lipid membrane and cholesterol biosynthesis. They are also used for energy.
  - Bile salts: Bile salts are secreted from liver and they facilitate lipid digestion in the small intestine.
  - Eicosanoids: Eicosanoids are made from fatty acids in the body and they are used for cell signaling.
  - Ketone bodies: Ketone bodies are made from fatty acids in the liver. Their function is to produce energy during periods of starvation or low food intake.
