= Oxidization =

Oxidization may refer to:

- Oxidation, a chemical reaction in which electrons are lost
- Beta oxidation, the process by which fatty acids are broken down in mitochondria and/or peroxisomes
- Rust
