= Acyl-CoA dehydrogenase (NADP+) =

Class of enzymes

acyl-CoA dehydrogenase (NADP+)

Identifiers
- EC no.: 1.3.1.8
- CAS no.: 37251-07-3

Databases
- IntEnz: IntEnz view
- BRENDA: BRENDA entry
- ExPASy: NiceZyme view
- KEGG: KEGG entry
- MetaCyc: metabolic pathway
- PRIAM: profile
- PDB structures: RCSB PDB PDBe PDBsum
- Gene Ontology: AmiGO / QuickGO
Search
- PMC: articles
- PubMed: articles
- NCBI: proteins

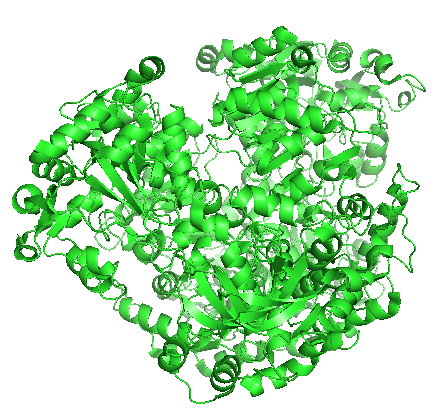
Structure of Crotonyl CoA carboxylase/reductase. From Streptomycs collinus.

In enzymology, acyl-CoA dehydrogenase (NADP+) (EC 1.3.1.8) is an enzyme that catalyzes the chemical reaction

RCH_{2}CH_{2}CO-CoA + NADP^{+} $\rightleftharpoons$ RCH_{2}=CH_{2}CO-CoA + NADPH + H^{+}

The two substrates of this enzyme are an acyl-CoA and oxidised nicotinamide adenine dinucleotide phosphate (NADP^{+}). Its products are the corresponding 2,3-dehydroacyl-CoA, reduced NADPH, and a proton. The enzyme does not alter the length of the chain attached to coenzyme A but creates a double bond adjacent to the carbonyl group.

This enzyme belongs to the family of oxidoreductases, specifically those acting on the CH-CH group of donor with NAD+ or NADP+ as acceptor. The systematic name of this enzyme class is acyl-CoA:NADP+ 2-oxidoreductase. Other names in common use include 2-enoyl-CoA reductase, dehydrogenase, acyl coenzyme A (nicotinamide adenine dinucleotide, phosphate), enoyl coenzyme A reductase, crotonyl coenzyme A reductase, crotonyl-CoA reductase, and acyl-CoA dehydrogenase (NADP+).
