= Trans-2-enoyl-CoA reductase (NAD+) =

Class of enzymes

trans-2-enoyl-CoA reductase (NAD+)

Identifiers
- EC no.: 1.3.1.44
- CAS no.: 77649-64-0

Databases
- IntEnz: IntEnz view
- BRENDA: BRENDA entry
- ExPASy: NiceZyme view
- KEGG: KEGG entry
- MetaCyc: metabolic pathway
- PRIAM: profile
- PDB structures: RCSB PDB PDBe PDBsum
- Gene Ontology: AmiGO / QuickGO
Search
- PMC: articles
- PubMed: articles
- NCBI: proteins

In enzymology, a trans-2-enoyl-CoA reductase (NAD+) (EC 1.3.1.44) is an enzyme that catalyzes the chemical reaction

trans-2,3-dehydroacyl-CoA + NADH + H^{+} $\rightleftharpoons$ acyl-CoA + NAD^{+}

Thus, the three substrates of this enzyme are trans-didehydroacyl-CoA, NADH, and H^{+}, whereas its two products are acyl-CoA and NAD^{+}.

This enzyme belongs to the family of oxidoreductases, specifically those acting on the CH-CH group of donor with NAD+ or NADP+ as acceptor. The systematic name of this enzyme class is acyl-CoA:NAD+ trans-2-oxidoreductase. This enzyme is also called trans-2-enoyl-CoA reductase (NAD+). This enzyme participates in butanoate metabolism.
