= GLYAT =

Protein-coding gene in the species Homo sapiens

Identifiers
- Aliases: GLYAT, ACGNAT, CAT, GAT, glycine-N-acyltransferase
- External IDs: OMIM: 607424; MGI: 2147502; GeneCards: GLYAT
Enzyme activity
EC #	BRENDA	ExPASy	KEGG	MetaCyc
2.3.1.13	↗	↗	↗	↗
2.3.1.71	↗	↗	↗	↗

Gene location (Human)
Chr.	Chromosome 11 (human)
Band	11q12.1	Start	58,640,426 bp
Band	11q12.1	End	58,731,974 bp

Gene location (Mouse)
Chr.	Chromosome 19 (mouse)
Band	19|19 A	Start	12,610,672 bp
Band	19|19 A	End	12,631,275 bp
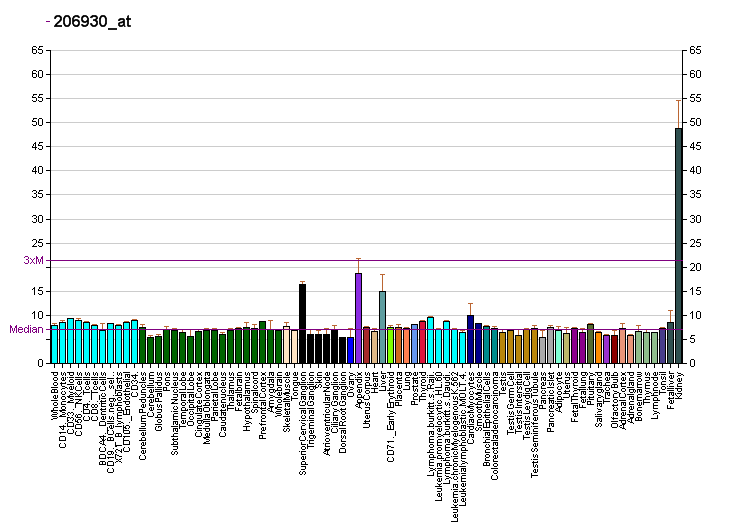

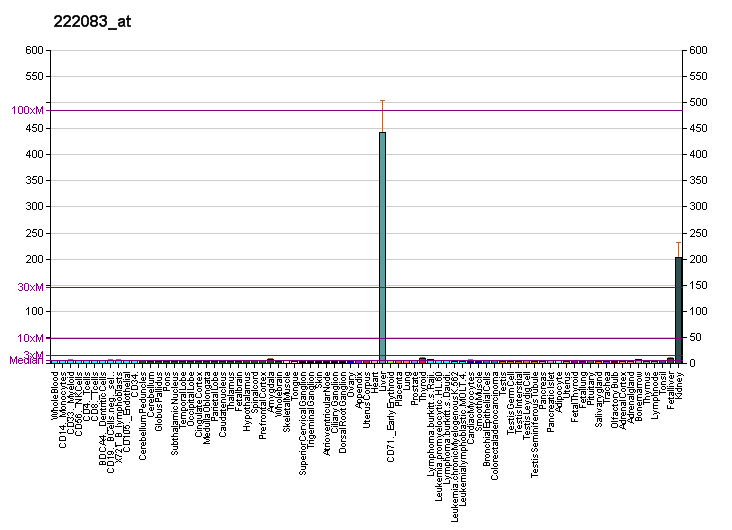
RNA expression pattern
Bgee	Human / Mouse (ortholog); Top expressed in: right lobe of liver; kidney tubule; glomerulus; metanephric glomerulus; renal medulla; subcutaneous adipose tissue; sural nerve; abdominal fat; tibialis anterior muscle; human kidney / Top expressed in: right kidney; human kidney; left lobe of liver; proximal tubule; lumbar spinal ganglion; facial motor nucleus; lumbar subsegment of spinal cord; anterior horn of spinal cord; primary visual cortex; crypt of lieberkuhn of small intestine; More reference expression data
BioGPS	More reference expression data
Gene ontology
Molecular function	transferase activity; acyltransferase activity; protein binding; glycine N-acyltransferase activity; glycine N-benzoyltransferase activity
Cellular component	mitochondrial matrix; mitochondrion
Biological process	xenobiotic metabolic process; acyl-CoA metabolic process; monocarboxylic acid metabolic process; response to toxic substance; glycine metabolic process; benzoyl-CoA metabolic process
Sources:Amigo / QuickGO
Orthologs
Databases	NCBI: entry; OMA: entry
Species	Human	Mouse
Entrez	10249	107146
Ensembl	ENSG00000149124	ENSMUSG00000063683
UniProt	Q6IB77	Q91XE0
RefSeq (mRNA)	NM_201648; NM_005838	NM_145935
RefSeq (protein)	NP_005829; NP_964011	NP_666047
Location (UCSC)	Chr 11: 58.64 – 58.73 Mb	Chr 19: 12.61 – 12.63 Mb
PubMed search
- Wikidata
View/Edit Human	View/Edit Mouse

Glycine-N-acyltransferase, also known as GLYAT, is an enzyme which in humans is encoded by the GLYAT gene.

== Function ==
The glycine-N-acyltransferase protein conjugates glycine with acyl-CoA substrates in the mitochondria primarily in liver and kidney. The glycine N-acyltransferase enzyme is involved in the detoxification of a wide range of xenobiotic and endogenous metabolites. These include benzoic acid, a compound found in fruits and vegetables and used in medicine and foodstuffs as a preservative; salicylic acid, a metabolite of aspirin; and several endogenous metabolites. The diversity is demonstrated by the wide range of acylglycines excreted in the urines of patients with defects of organic acid metabolism. No defect of glycine N-acyltransferase has yet been described, but it has been demonstrated that there is significant inter individual variation in glycine conjugation capacity. Human glycine N-acyltransferase isoform a is a 296 amino acid protein translated from mRNA transcript splice variant 1. It is encoded by exons 2 to 6 of the mRNA transcript.

== Molecular weight ==
The literature reports it to be approximately 30 kDa, or approximately 27 kDa. The predicted size is 33.9 KDa. For the bovine enzyme a range of sizes between approximately 33 kDa and about 36 KDa is reported (Nandi, 1979, Vessey, 1992, van der Westhuizen, 2000). The predicted size of bovine GLYAT based on its sequence (accession number nm: 177486), is 33.9 kDa. This compares well to the experimentally determined sizes
