= Beta-ketodecanoyl-(acyl-carrier-protein) synthase =

Enzyme

Identifiers
- EC no.: 2.3.1.207

Databases
- IntEnz: IntEnz view
- BRENDA: BRENDA entry
- ExPASy: NiceZyme view
- KEGG: KEGG entry
- MetaCyc: metabolic pathway
- PRIAM: profile
- PDB structures: RCSB PDB PDBe PDBsum
Search
- PMC: articles
- PubMed: articles
- NCBI: proteins

Beta-ketodecanoyl-(acyl-carrier-protein) synthase (EC 2.3.1.207) is an enzyme with systematic name octanoyl-CoA:malonyl-(acyl-carrier protein) C-heptanoylltransferase (decarboxylating, CoA-forming). This enzyme catalyses the following chemical reaction

octanoyl-CoA + malonyl-[acyl-carrier protein] $\rightleftharpoons$ 3-oxodecanoyl-[acyl-carrier protein] + CoA + CO_{2}

This enzyme is purified from the bacterium Pseudomonas aeruginosa PAO1.
