= CaiA RNA motif =

Conserved RNA structure

caiA
- Consensus secondary structure and sequence conservation of caiA RNA

Identifiers
- Symbol: caiA
- Rfam: RF02934

Other data
- RNA type: Gene; sRNA
- SO: SO:0001263
- PDB structures: PDBe

The caiA RNA motif is a conserved RNA structure that was discovered by bioinformatics. caiA motifs are found in Clostridiales.

caiA RNAs are found upstream of genes whose protein products function as acyl CoA dehydrogenases, although in one case the annotated substrate is butyryl-CoA. caiA RNAs might regulate these genes (i.e. function as cis-regulatory elements), but it is also possible that their association with these genes is a coincidence.
