= P/O ratio =

The phosphate/oxygen ratio, or P/O ratio, refers to the amount of ATP produced from the movement of two electrons through a defined electron transport chain, terminated by reduction of an oxygen atom.

The P/O ratio is dependent on the number of hydrogen ions transported outward across an electrochemical gradient, and the number of protons which return inward through the membrane via an enzyme such as ATP synthase. The ATP synthase works by a rotary mechanism. The ATP generated will be dependent on the amount of ATP produced per rotation of the ATP synthase rotor, and the number of protons necessary to complete a rotation. Every full rotation produces 3 ATPs. According to current understanding of the mechanism of the F_{0} part, the number of protons translocated per rotation is exactly equal to the number of subunits in the c ring. Recent structural studies show that this is not the same for all organisms. For vertebrate mitochondrial ATP synthase, the number of c subunits is 8 . The synthase thus requires 8 protons to synthesize three ATP, or 8/3 protons/ATP.

Inward moving protons must not only power rotation of ATP synthase, but may also be used in the transport of products and precursors. Given the net charge differences between ATP and ADP, the enzyme ATP–ADP translocase dissipates the charge equivalent of one hydrogen ion from the gradient when moving ATP (outward) and ADP (inward) across the inner mitochondrial membrane. The electroneutral symport of phosphate ion and H+ results in importing one proton, without its charge, per phosphate. Taken together, import of ADP and Pi and export of the resulting ATP results in one proton imported, subtracting from the number available for use by the ATP synthase directly. Taking this into account, it takes 8/3 +1 or 3.67 protons for vertebrate mitochondria to synthesize one ATP in the cytoplasm from ADP and Pi in the cytoplasm.

Within aerobic respiration, the P/O ratio continues to be debated; however, current figures place it at 2.5 ATP per 1/2(O_{2}) reduced to water, though some claim the ratio is 3. This figure arises from accepting that 10 H^{+} are transported out of the matrix per 2 e^{−}, and 4 H^{+} are required to move inward to synthesize a molecule of ATP.

The H+/2e^{−} ratios of the three major respiratory complexes are generally agreed to be 4, 4, and 2 for Complexes I, III, and IV respectively. The H^{+}/O ratio thus depends whether the substrate electrons enter at the level of NADH (passing through all three for 10 H^{+}/2e^{−}) or ubiquinol (passing through only complexes III and IV for 6H^{+}/2e^{−}). The latter is the case when the substrate is succinate or extramitochondrial NADH being oxidized via the glycerol phosphate shuttle; or other UQH2-linked dehydrogenase. During normal aerobic respiration the ratio would be somewhere between these values, as the TCA cycle produces both NADH and ubiquinol.

The resulting P/O ratio would be the ratio of H/O and H/P; which is 10/3.67 or 2.73 for NADH-linked respiration, and 6/3.67 or 1.64 for UQH2-linked respiration, with actual values being somewhere between.
