= Fatty acyl-CoA esters =

Acyl CoA with a fatty acid tail

Chemical structure of palmitoyl-CoA, a fatty acyl-CoA ester

Fatty acyl-CoA esters are fatty acid derivatives formed of one fatty acid, a 3'-phospho-AMP linked to phosphorylated pantothenic acid (vitamin B_{5}) and cysteamine.

Long-chain acyl-CoA esters are substrates for a number of important enzymatic reactions and play a central role in the regulation of metabolism as allosteric regulators of several enzymes. To participate in specific metabolic processes, fatty acids must first be activated by being joined in thioester linkage (R-CO-SCoA) to the -SH group of coenzyme A, where R is a fatty carbon chain. The thioester bond is a high energy bond.

The activation reaction normally occurs in the endoplasmic reticulum or the outer mitochondrial membrane. This is an adenosine triphosphate (ATP)-requiring reaction with fatty acyl-CoA synthase (CoASH), yielding adenosine monophosphate (AMP) and pyrophosphate (PPi):

R-COOH + CoASH + ATP $\rightleftharpoons$ R-CO-SCoA + AMP + PPi

Different enzymes are specific for fatty acids of different chain length. Then, the acyl-CoA esters are transported in mitochondria. They are converted to fatty acyl carnitine by carnitine acyltransferase I, an enzyme of the inner leaflet of the outer mitochondrial membrane. Fatty acyl carnitine is then transported by an antiport in exchange for free carnitine to the inner surface of the inner mitochondrial membrane. There carnitine acyltransferase II reverses the process, producing fatty acyl-CoA and carnitine. This shuttle mechanism is required only for longer chain fatty acids. Once inside the mitochondrial matrix, the fatty acyl-CoA derivatives are degraded by a series of reactions that release acetyl-CoA and leads to the production of NADH and FADH2. There are four steps the in fatty acid beta-oxidation pathway; oxidation, hydration, oxidation, and thiolysis. It requires 7 rounds of this pathway to degrade palmitate (a C16 fatty acid).

== Examples ==
- Esters of straight-chain saturated fatty acids
  - Propionyl-CoA
  - Butyryl-CoA
  - Octanoyl-CoA
  - Palmitoyl-CoA
  - Stearoyl-CoA
- Esters of branched-chain saturated fatty acids
  - Isobutyryl-CoA
  - Isovaleryl-CoA
  - 2-Methylbutyryl-CoA
  - Phytanoyl-CoA
