= Enoyl-CoA hydratase =

Class of enzymes

enoyl-Coenzyme A, hydratase/3-hydroxyacyl Coenzyme A dehydrogenase
- Enoyl-CoA hydratase hexamer from a rat with active site in orange and substrate in red.

Identifiers
- Symbol: EHHADH
- Alt. symbols: ECHD
- NCBI gene: 1962
- HGNC: 3247
- OMIM: 607037
- RefSeq: NM_001966
- UniProt: Q08426

Other data
- EC number: 4.2.1.17
- Locus: Chr. 3 q26.3-q28
Search for
- Structures: Swiss-model
- Domains: InterPro

Enoyl-CoA hydratase (ECH) or crotonase is an enzyme EC 4.2.1.17 that hydrates the double bond between the second and third carbons on 2-trans/cis-enoyl-CoA:

ECH is essential to metabolizing fatty acids in beta oxidation to produce both acetyl CoA and energy in the form of ATP.

ECH of rats is a hexameric protein (this trait is not universal, but the human enzyme is also hexameric), which leads to the efficiency of this enzyme as it has six active sites. This enzyme has been discovered to be highly efficient, and allows people to metabolize fatty acids into energy very quickly. In fact this enzyme is so efficient that the rate for short chain fatty acids is equivalent to that of diffusion-controlled reactions.

== Metabolism ==
=== Fatty acid metabolism ===
ECH catalyzes the second step (hydration) in the breakdown of fatty acids (β-oxidation). Fatty acid metabolism is how human bodies turn fats into energy. Fats in foods are generally in the form of triglycerols. These must be broken down in order for the fats to pass into human bodies. When that happens, three fatty acids are released.

=== Leucine metabolism ===
Leucine metabolism in humans

Human metabolic pathway for HMB and isovaleryl-CoA relative to L-leucine. Of the two major pathways, L-leucine is mostly metabolized into isovaleryl-CoA, while only about 5% is metabolized into HMB.

== Mechanism ==
ECH is used in β-oxidation to add a hydroxyl group and a proton to the unsaturated β-carbon on a fatty-acyl CoA. ECH functions by providing two glutamate residues as catalytic acid and base. The two amino acids hold a water molecule in place, allowing it to attack in a syn addition to an α-β unsaturated acyl-CoA at the β-carbon. The α-carbon then grabs another proton, which completes the formation of the beta-hydroxy acyl-CoA.

Concerted reaction.

It is also known from experimental data that no other sources of protons reside in the active site. This means that the proton which the α-carbon grabs is from the water that just attacked the β-carbon. What this implies is that the hydroxyl group and the proton from water are both added from the same side of the double bond, a syn addition. This allows ECH to make an S stereoisomer from 2-trans-enoyl-CoA and an R stereoisomer from the 2-cis-enoyl-CoA. This is made possible by the two glutamate residues which hold the water in position directly adjacent to the α-β unsaturated double bond. This configuration requires that the active site for ECH is extremely rigid, to hold the water in a very specific configuration with regard to the acyl-CoA. The data for a mechanism for this reaction is not conclusive as to whether this reaction is concerted (shown in the picture) or occurs in consecutive steps. If occurring in consecutive steps, the intermediate is identical to that which would be generated from an E1cB-elimination reaction.

ECH is mechanistically similar to fumarase.
