= Octanoyl-CoA =

Names
- IUPAC name 3′-O-Phosphonoadenosine 5′-{(3R)-3-hydroxy-2,2-dimethyl-4-[(3-{[2-(octanoylsulfanyl)ethyl]amino}-3-oxopropyl)amino]-4-oxobutyl dihydrogen diphosphate}
- Systematic IUPAC name O^{1}-{[(2R,3S,4R,5R)-5-(6-Amino-9H-purin-9-yl)-4-hydroxy-3-(phosphonooxy)oxolan-2-yl]methyl} O^{3}-{(3R)-3-hydroxy-2,2-dimethyl-4-[(3-{[2-(octanoylsulfanyl)ethyl]amino}-3-oxopropyl)amino]-4-oxobutyl} dihydrogen diphosphate

Identifiers
CAS Number	1264-52-4
3D model (JSmol)	Interactive image
Beilstein Reference	6562085
ChEBI	CHEBI:15533
ChemSpider	393007
DrugBank	DB02910
KEGG	C01944
MeSH	octanoyl-coenzyme+A
PubChem CID	445344
- InChI: InChI=1S/C29H50N7O17P3S/c1-4-5-6-7-8-9-20(38)57-13-12-31-19(37)10-11-32-27(41)24(40)29(2,3)15-50-56(47,48)53-55(45,46)49-14-18-23(52-54(42,43)44)22(39)28(51-18)36-17-35-21-25(30)33-16-34-26(21)36/h16-18,22-24,28,39-40H,4-15H2,1-3H3,(H,31,37)(H,32,41)(H,45,46)(H,47,48)(H2,30,33,34)(H2,42,43,44)/t18-,22-,23-,24+,28-/m1/s1 Key: KQMZYOXOBSXMII-CECATXLMSA-N
- SMILES: CCCCCCCC(=O)SCCNC(=O)CCNC(=O)[C@@H](C(C)(C)COP(=O)(O)OP(=O)(O)OC[C@@H]1[C@H]([C@H]([C@@H](O1)N2C=NC3=C(N=CN=C32)N)O)OP(=O)(O)O)O

Properties
Chemical formula	C_{29}H_{50}N_{7}O_{17}P_{3}S
Molar mass	893.732 g/mol
- Except where otherwise noted, data are given for materials in their standard state (at 25 °C [77 °F], 100 kPa). verify (what is ?) Infobox references

Octanoyl-coenzyme A is the endpoint of beta oxidation in peroxisomes. It is produced alongside acetyl-CoA and transferred to the mitochondria to be further oxidized into acetyl-CoA.

== See also ==
- Caprylic acid, the eight-carbon saturated fatty acid known by the systematic name octanoic acid.
