= Acyl-CoA =

Group of coenzymes that metabolize fatty acids

General chemical structure of an acyl-CoA, where R is a carboxylic acid side chain

Acyl-CoA is a group of CoA-based coenzymes that metabolize carboxylic acids. Fatty acyl-CoA's are susceptible to beta oxidation, forming, ultimately, acetyl-CoA. The acetyl-CoA enters the citric acid cycle, eventually forming several equivalents of ATP. In this way, fats are converted to ATP, the common biochemical energy carrier.

== Functions ==
=== Fatty acid activation ===
Fats are broken down by conversion to acyl-CoA. This conversion is one response to high energy demands such as exercise. The oxidative degradation of fatty acids is a two-step process, catalyzed by acyl-CoA synthetase. Fatty acids are converted to their acyl phosphate, the precursor to acyl-CoA. The latter conversion is mediated by acyl-CoA synthase"

acyl-P + HS-CoA → acyl-S-CoA + P_{i} + H^{+}

Three types of acyl-CoA synthases are employed, depending on the chain length of the fatty acid. For example, the substrates for medium chain acyl-CoA synthase are 4-11 carbon fatty acids. The enzyme acyl-CoA thioesterase takes of the acyl-CoA to form a free fatty acid and coenzyme A.

=== Beta oxidation of acyl-CoA ===
The second step of fatty acid degradation is beta oxidation. Beta oxidation occurs in mitochondria. After formation in the cytosol, acyl-CoA is transported into the mitochondria, the locus of beta oxidation. Transport of acyl-CoA into the mitochondria requires carnitine palmitoyltransferase 1 (CPT1), which converts acyl-CoA into acylcarnitine, which gets transported into the mitochondrial matrix. Once in the matrix, acylcarnitine is converted back to acyl-CoA by CPT2. Beta oxidation may begin now that Acyl-CoA is in the mitochondria.

Beta oxidation of acyl-CoA occurs in four steps.

1. Acyl-CoA dehydrogenase catalyzes dehydrogenation of the acyl-CoA, creating a double bond between the alpha and beta carbons. FAD is the hydrogen acceptor, yielding FADH2.

2. Enoyl-CoA hydrase catalyzes the addition of water across the newly formed double bond to make an alcohol.

3. 3-hydroxyacyl-CoA dehydrogenase oxidizes the alcohol group to a ketone. NADH is produced from NAD+.

4. Thiolase cleaves between the alpha carbon and ketone to release one molecule of Acetyl-CoA and the Acyl-CoA which is now 2 carbons shorter.

This four step process repeats until acyl-CoA has removed all carbons from the chain, leaving only Acetyl-CoA. During one cycle of beta oxidation, Acyl-CoA creates one molecule of Acetyl-CoA, FADH2, and NADH. Acetyl-CoA is then used in the citric acid cycle while FADH2 and NADH are sent to the electron transport chain. These intermediates all end up providing energy for the body as they are ultimately converted to ATP.

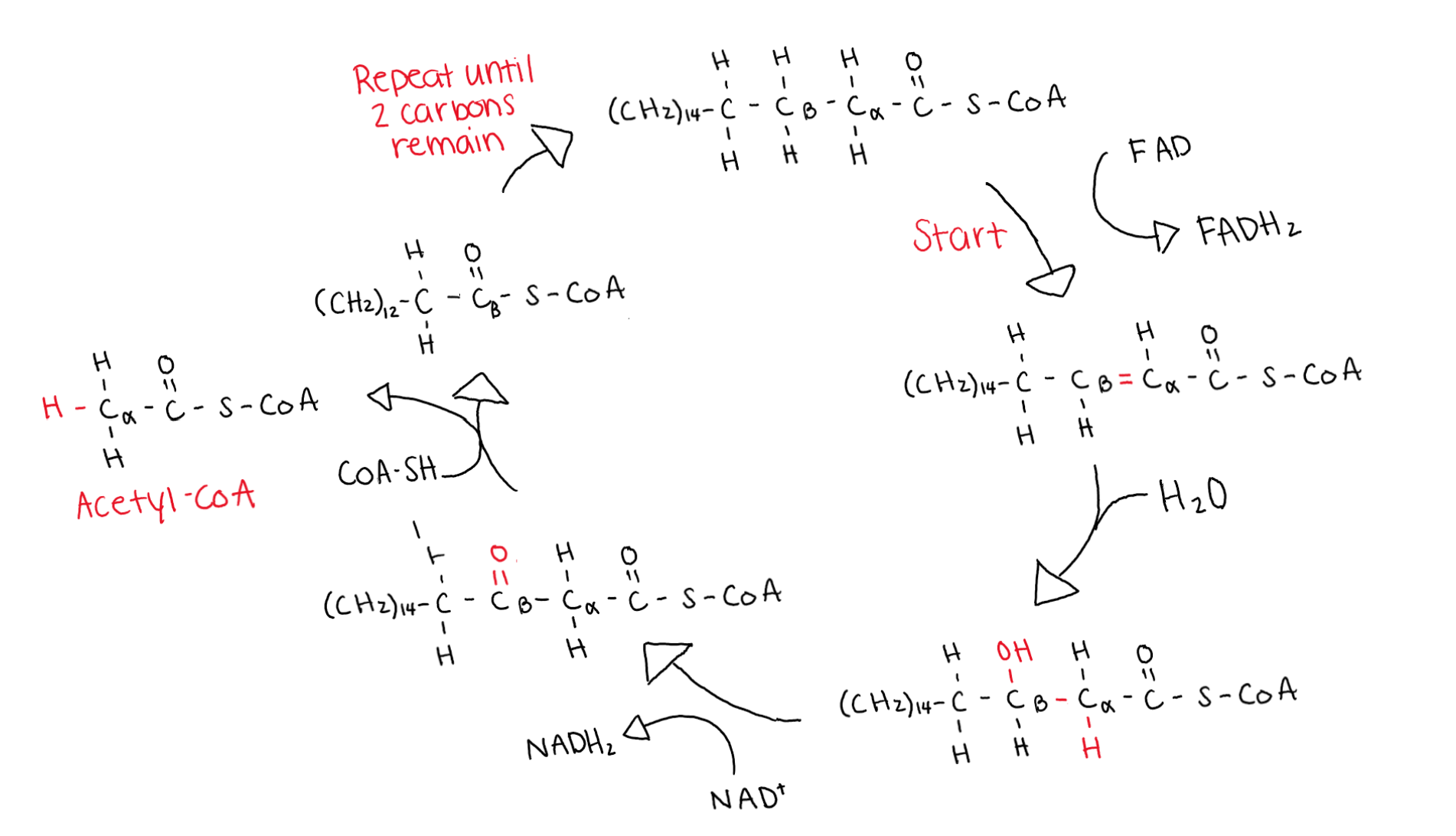
Example of Beta Oxidation using Stearic Acid

Beta oxidation, as well as alpha-oxidation, also occurs in the peroxisome. The peroxisome handles beta oxidation of fatty acids that have more than 20 carbons in their chain because the peroxisome contains very-long-chain Acyl-CoA synthetases. These enzymes are better equipped to oxidize Acyl-CoA with long chains that the mitochondria cannot handle.

==== Example using stearic acid ====
Beta oxidation removes 2 carbons at a time, so in the oxidation of an 18 carbon fatty acid such as Stearic Acid 8 cycles will need to occur to completely break down Acyl-CoA. This will produce 9 Acetyl-CoA that have 2 carbons each, 8 FADH2, and 8 NADH.

== Clinical significance ==
Heart muscle primarily metabolizes fat for energy and Acyl-CoA metabolism has been identified as a critical molecule in early stage heart muscle pump failure.

Cellular acyl-CoA content correlates with insulin resistance, suggesting that it can mediate lipotoxicity in non-adipose tissues. Acyl-CoA: diacylglycerol acyltransferase (DGAT) plays an important role in energy metabolism on account of key enzyme in triglyceride biosynthesis. The synthetic role of DGAT in adipose tissue such as the liver and the intestine, sites where endogenous levels of its activity and triglyceride synthesis are high and comparatively clear. Also, any changes in the activity levels might cause changes in systemic insulin sensitivity and energy homeostasis.

A rare disease called multiple acyl-CoA dehydrogenase deficiency (MADD) is a fatty acid metabolism disorder. Acyl-CoA is important because this enzyme helps make Acyl-CoA from free fatty acids, and this activates the fatty acid to be metabolized. This compromised fatty acid oxidation leads to many different symptoms, including severe symptoms such as cardiomyopathy and liver disease and mild symptoms such as episodic metabolic decomposition, muscle weakness and respiratory failure. MADD is a genetic disorder, caused by a mutation in the ETFA, ETFB, and ETFDH genes. MADD is known as an "autosomal recessive disorder" because for one to get this disorder, one must receive this recessive gene from both parents.

== See also ==
- Acetyl-CoA
- Beta oxidation
- Coenzyme A
- Acyl CoA dehydrogenase
- Fatty acid metabolism
- Fatty acyl-CoA esters
