= Inborn error of lipid metabolism =

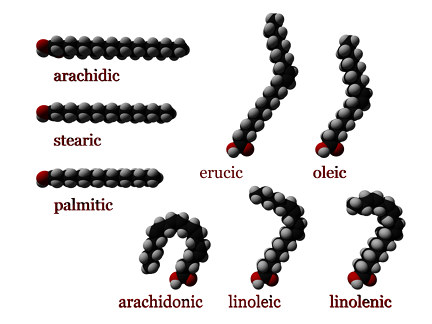
- Several fatty acid molecules
- Specialty: Endocrinology

Numerous genetic disorders are caused by errors in fatty acid metabolism. These disorders may be described as fatty oxidation disorders or as lipid storage disorders, and are any one of several inborn errors of metabolism that result from enzyme defects affecting the ability of the body to oxidize fatty acids in order to produce energy within muscles, liver, and other cell types.

Some of the more common fatty acid metabolism disorders are:

== Coenzyme A dehydrogenase deficiencies ==
- Very long-chain acyl-coenzyme A dehydrogenase deficiency (VLCAD) - Very long-chain acyl-coenzyme A dehydrogenase
- Long-chain 3-hydroxyacyl-coenzyme A dehydrogenase deficiency (LCHAD) - Long-chain 3-hydroxyacyl-coenzyme A
- Medium-chain acyl-coenzyme A dehydrogenase deficiency (MCAD) - Medium-chain acyl-coenzyme A dehydrogenase
- Short-chain acyl-coenzyme A dehydrogenase deficiency (SCAD) - Short-chain acyl-coenzyme A dehydrogenase
- 3-hydroxyacyl-coenzyme A dehydrogenase deficiency (HADH) - 3-hydroxyacyl-coenzyme A dehydrogenase

== Other Coenzyme A enzyme deficiencies ==
- 2,4 Dienoyl-CoA reductase deficiency - 2,4 Dienoyl-CoA reductase
- 3-hydroxy-3-methylglutaryl-CoA lyase deficiency - 3-hydroxy-3-methylglutaryl-CoA lyase
- Malonyl-CoA decarboxylase deficiency - Malonyl-CoA decarboxylase

== Carnitine related ==
- Primary carnitine deficiency - SLC22A5 (carnitine transporter)
- Carnitine-acylcarnitine translocase deficiency - Carnitine-acylcarnitine translocase
- Carnitine palmitoyltransferase I deficiency (CPT) - Carnitine palmitoyltransferase I
- Carnitine palmitoyltransferase II deficiency (CPT) - Carnitine palmitoyltransferase II

== Lipid storage ==
- Acid lipase diseases
  - Wolman disease
  - Cholesteryl ester storage disease
- Gaucher disease
- Niemann-Pick disease
- Fabry disease
- Farber's disease
- Gangliosidoses
- Krabbé disease
- Metachromatic leukodystrophy

== Other ==
- Spinal muscular atrophy
- Mitochondrial trifunctional protein deficiency
- Electron transfer flavoprotein (ETF) dehydrogenase deficiency (GAII & MADD)
- Tangier disease
- Acute fatty liver of pregnancy

== See also ==
- Fatty acid synthase
- Essential fatty acid
- Fatty acid metabolism
- Orthomolecular medicine
