= Fatty-acid metabolism disorder =

- Acyl-CoA, one of the compounds involved in fatty acid metabolism
- Specialty: Endocrinology

A broad classification for genetic disorders that result from an inability of the body to produce or utilize an enzyme or transport protein that is required to oxidize fatty acids. They are an inborn error of lipid metabolism, and when it affects the muscles also a metabolic myopathy.

The enzyme or transport protein can be missing or improperly constructed, resulting in it not working. This leaves the body unable to produce energy within the liver and muscles from fatty acid sources.

The body's primary source of energy is glucose; however, when all the glucose in the body has been expended, a normal body digests fats. Individuals with a fatty-acid metabolism disorder are unable to metabolize this fat source for energy, halting bodily processes. Most individuals with a fatty-acid metabolism disorder are able to live a normal active life with simple adjustments to diet and medications.

If left undiagnosed many complications can arise. When in need of glucose the body of a person with a fatty-acid metabolism disorder will still send fats to the liver. The fats are broken down to fatty acids. The fatty acids are then transported to the target cells but are unable to be broken down, resulting in a build-up of fatty acids in the liver and other internal organs.

Fatty-acid metabolism disorders are sometimes classified with the lipid metabolism disorders, but in other contexts they are considered a distinct category.

== Types ==
Incomplete list of various fatty-acid metabolism disorders.

- Carnitine Transport Defect
- Carnitine-acylcarnitine translocase deficiency (CACT)
- Carnitine Palmitoyl Transferase I & II ( CPT I deficiency & CPT II deficiency)
- 2,4 Dienoyl-CoA Reductase Deficiency
- Electron Transfer Flavoprotein (ETF) Dehydrogenase Deficiency (GA-II/MADD)
- 3-Hydroxy-3-methylglutaryl-CoA lyase deficiency (HMG deficiency)
- Very long-chain acyl-coenzyme A dehydrogenase deficiency (VLCAD deficiency)
- Long-chain 3-hydroxyacyl-coenzyme A dehydrogenase deficiency (LCHAD deficiency)
- Medium-chain acyl-coenzyme A dehydrogenase deficiency (MCAD deficiency)
- Short-chain acyl-coenzyme A dehydrogenase deficiency (SCAD deficiency)
- 3-hydroxyacyl-coenzyme A dehydrogenase deficiency (M/SCHAD deficiency)

=== Oxidation ===
The term fatty acid oxidation disorder (FAOD) is sometimes used, especially when there is an emphasis on the oxidation of the fatty acid.

In addition to the fetal complications, they can also cause complications for the mother during pregnancy.

Examples include:

- Mitochondrial trifunctional protein deficiency (MTPD)
- MCADD, LCHADD, and VLCADD

Schematic demonstrating mitochondrial fatty acid beta-oxidation and effects of LCHAD deficiency

=== Carnitine/transport ===
The fatty acids are transported by carnitine, and defects in this process are associated with several disorders. They involve the step immediately before oxidation, and are often grouped with the oxidation disorders.

Transport

== Symptoms and signs ==
- Extreme sleepiness
- Behavior changes
- Irritable mood
- Poor appetite
- Fever
- Nausea
- Diarrhea
- Vomiting
- Hypoglycemia
- Enlarged heart
- Muscle weakness
- Heart failure
- While at rest, some exhibit cardiac arrhythmia (commonly various forms of tachycardia, but more rarely, conduction disorders or acute bradycardia); while others have a normal heart rhythm

== Causes ==
Fatty-acid metabolism disorders result when both parents of the diagnosed subject are carriers of a defective gene. This is known as an autosomal recessive disorder. Two parts of a recessive gene are required to activate the disease. If only one part of the gene is present then the individual is only a carrier and shows no symptoms of the disease. If both mutated genes are present, the individual will be symptomatic. Like most autosomal recessive disorders, when both parents are carriers, there is a 25% chance for each child to inherit the disease.

== Diagnosis ==
Diagnosis of Fatty-acid metabolism disorder requires extensive lab testing.

Normally, in cases of hypoglycaemia, triglycerides and fatty acids are metabolised to provide glucose/energy. However, in this process, ketones are also produced and ketotic hypoglycaemia is expected. However, in cases where fatty acid metabolism is impaired, a non-ketotic hypoglycaemia may be the result, due to a break in the metabolic pathways for fatty-acid metabolism.

== Treatment ==
The primary treatment method for fatty-acid metabolism disorders is dietary modification. It is essential that the blood-glucose levels remain at adequate levels to prevent the body from moving fat to the liver for energy. This involves snacking on low-fat, high-carbohydrate nutrients every 2–6 hours. However, some adults and children can sleep for 8–10 hours through the night without snacking.

=== Drugs ===
Carnitor - an L-carnitine supplement that has shown to improve the body's metabolism in individuals with low L-carnitine levels. It is only useful for Specific fatty-acid metabolism disease.

== See also ==
- Mitochondrion
- Fatty acid metabolism
- Beta oxidation
- Metabolic myopathies
