= MCAD =

MCAD may refer to:

== Science and technology ==
- ACADM or MCAD, a gene
  - Medium-chain acyl-CoA dehydrogenase, an enzyme used in lipid metabolism
  - Medium-chain acyl-coenzyme A dehydrogenase deficiency (MCAD deficiency or MCADD), caused by mutations in the ACADM gene
- Mast cell activation disorder, a disease
- Microsoft Certified Application Developer
- Mechanical computer-aided design

== Organizations ==
- Massachusetts Commission Against Discrimination, US
- Minneapolis College of Art and Design, US
