= HMG-CoA lyase, mitochondrial =

Enzyme found in humans

HMGCL

Identifiers
- Aliases: HMGCL, HL, 3-hydroxymethyl-3-methylglutaryl-CoA lyase, 3-hydroxy-3-methylglutaryl-CoA lyase
- External IDs: OMIM: 613898; MGI: 96158; GeneCards: HMGCL
Available structures
| PDB | Ortholog search: PDBe RCSB |
| PDB | List of PDB id codes 2CW6, 3MP3, 3MP4, 3MP5 |
Enzyme activity
| EC # | BRENDA | ExPASy | KEGG | MetaCyc |
|---|---|---|---|---|
| 4.1.3.4 | ↗ | ↗ | ↗ | ↗ |

Gene location (Human)
| Chr. | Chromosome 1 (human) |
| Band | 1p36.11 | Start | 23,801,885 bp |
| Band | 1p36.11 | End | 23,838,620 bp |

Gene location (Mouse)
| Chr. | Chromosome 4 (mouse) |
| Band | 4 D3|4 68.14 cM | Start | 135,673,759 bp |
| Band | 4 D3|4 68.14 cM | End | 135,689,928 bp |
RNA expression pattern
| Bgee | Human / Mouse (ortholog); Top expressed in: right lobe of liver; mucosa of transverse colon; human kidney; right adrenal gland; right adrenal cortex; Skeletal muscle tissue of rectus abdominis; left adrenal gland; kidney tubule; rectum; left adrenal cortex / Top expressed in: Ileal epithelium; left lobe of liver; right kidney; pyloric antrum; granulocyte; human kidney; interventricular septum; epithelium of stomach; proximal tubule; duodenum; More reference expression data |
| BioGPS | n/a |
Gene ontology
| Molecular function | fatty-acyl-CoA binding; manganese ion binding; protein homodimerization activity; hydroxymethylglutaryl-CoA lyase activity; metal ion binding; catalytic activity; carboxylic acid binding; lyase activity; signaling receptor binding; magnesium ion binding |
| Cellular component | peroxisome; mitochondrial matrix; mitochondrion; peroxisomal matrix; cytosol |
| Biological process | response to fatty acid; acyl-CoA metabolic process; response to nutrient; mitochondrion organization; protein tetramerization; ketone body biosynthetic process; response to starvation; liver development; leucine catabolic process; lipid metabolism; protein targeting to peroxisome |
Sources:Amigo / QuickGO
Orthologs
| Databases | NCBI: entry; OMA: entry |
| Species | Human | Mouse |
| Entrez | 3155 | 15356 |
| Ensembl | ENSG00000117305 | ENSMUSG00000028672 |
| UniProt | P35914 | P38060 |
| RefSeq (mRNA) | NM_001166059; NM_000191 | NM_008254; NM_001357529; NM_001357530 |
| RefSeq (protein) | NP_000182; NP_001159531 | NP_032280; NP_001344458; NP_001344459 |
| Location (UCSC) | Chr 1: 23.8 – 23.84 Mb | Chr 4: 135.67 – 135.69 Mb |
| PubMed search |
- Wikidata
| View/Edit Human | View/Edit Mouse |

Hydroxymethylglutaryl-CoA lyase
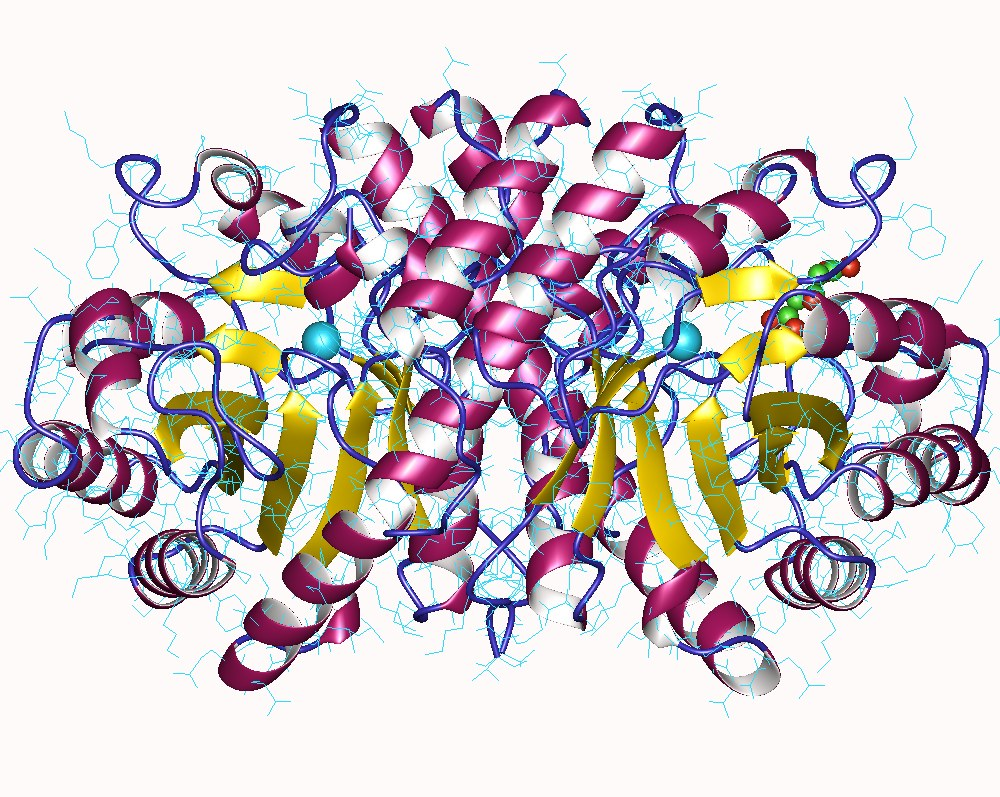
- HMG-CoA lyase dimer, Human

Identifiers
- EC no.: 4.1.3.4
- CAS no.: 9030-83-5

Databases
- BRENDA: enzyme data
- ExPASy: NiceZyme view
- KEGG: enzyme entry
- MetaCyc: metabolic pathway
- Rhea: reactions
- PDB structures: RCSB PDB PDBe PDBsum
- Gene Ontology: AmiGO / QuickGO
Search
- PMC: articles
- PubMed: articles
- NCBI: proteins

3-hydroxymethyl-3-methylglutaryl-Coenzyme A lyase (hydroxymethylglutaricaciduria)

Identifiers
- Symbol: HMGCL
- NCBI gene: 3155
- HGNC: 5005
- OMIM: 246450
- RefSeq: NM_000191
- UniProt: P35914

Other data
- EC number: 4.1.3.4
- Locus: Chr. 1 p36.1-p35
Search for
- Structures: Swiss-model
- Domains: InterPro

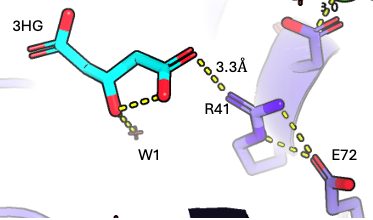
Substrate binding site makes a salt bridge between the 3HG (3-Hydroxy-3-methylglutaryl-CoA lyase) substrate and active Arg 41 with bond distance of 3.3Å. Also displays the bond between Arg 41 and Glu72 holding the structure in place. PDB code: 2cw6

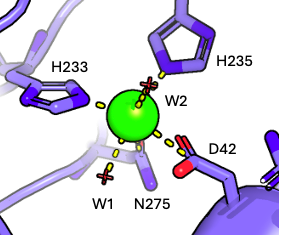
Metal-Ligand binding site displays octahedral bonding coordination utilizing 4 amino acids and 2 water molecules all with distances within 2.2Å . PDB code: 2cw6

HMG-CoA lyase, mitochondrial, also ambiguously called HMG-CoA lyase, is an enzyme (EC 4.1.3.4) that in human is encoded by the HMGCL gene. It is a key enzyme in ketogenesis (ketone body formation). It is a ketogenic enzyme in the liver that catalyzes the formation of acetoacetate from HMG-CoA within the mitochondria. It also plays a prominent role in the catabolism of the amino acid leucine.

== Structure ==
The HMGCL gene encodes a 34.5-kDa protein that is localized to the mitochondrion and peroxisome. Multible isoforms of the proteins are known due to alternative splicing. The major isoform (isoform 1) is most highly expressed in the liver whereas isoform 2 is found in energy-demanding tissues including the brain, heart, and skeletal muscle.

Structure of the HMGCL protein has been resolved by X-ray crystallography at 2.1-Å resolution, and reveals that the protein may function as a dimer. Substrate access to the active site of the HMGCL enzyme involves substrate binding across a cavity located at the C-terminal end of a beta barrel structure. In addition, the lysine 48 residue which is mutated in patients with 3-hydroxy-3-methylglutaryl-CoA lyase deficiency is also found to be necessary for substrate binding.

Electron density was observed indicating a bound metal ion, presumably Mg^{2+} due to its inclusion in the crystallization medium. The enzyme activity is dependent on the presence of the metal this was determined by mutating His233 to Ala233 and Asp42 to Asn42 and experiencing catalytic deficiency of 6.4E^{−3} k_{cat}/k_{M} and 1.3E^{−5} k_{cat}/k_{M} respectively. The substrate binding site includes arginine 41 making a salt bridge to the carboxylate of the hydroxyglutaric acid closest to metal ion. A mutation in Arg 41 results in a drastic decrease of catalytic activity. The extreme decrease in efficiency suggests the direct involvement in the chemistry of the catalytic reaction. This Arg41 also salt bridges to Glu72 to fold into the correct position and charge balance Arg41 to bind to the substrate.

== Function ==
The HMGCL protein plays an essential role in breaking down dietary proteins and fats for energy. It catalyzes the reaction:

(S)-3-hydroxy-3-methylglutaryl-CoA = acetyl-CoA + acetoacetate

and requires a divalent metal ion as co-factor.

The enzyme is required for ketogenesis in the liver, and is also responsible for processing the amino acid leucine inside the mitochondrion

Deficiency HMG-CoA lyase deficiency causes hypoketotic hypoglycemia similar to that is caused by HMGCS2 mutations but also leads to organic acid accumulation and metabolic acidosis due to altered leucine metabolism. This disorder can be mistaken for Reye syndrome because of the symptoms of vomiting, lethargy, and convulsions.

Ketogenesis

== Clinical significance ==
Mutations in the HMGCL gene cause 3-hydroxy-3-methylglutaryl-CoA lyase deficiency (HMGCLD), a rare autosomal recessive inborn error of metabolism characterized by disruption of ketogenesis and L-leucine catabolism. To-date more than 30 different mutations including missense mutations of different residues have been associated with patients with HMGCLD in diverse families and ethnicities. HMGCLD typically presents in the first year of the patient's life after a fasting period. Clinical acute symptoms include vomiting, seizures, metabolic acidosis, hypoketotic hypoglycemia, and lethargy.

== Interactions ==
HMGCL interacts with itself to form homodimers and homotetramers. It is also shown in yeast two-hybrid experiments to interact with DNAJA1.
