= Leukotriene C4 synthase deficiency =

- Leukotriene C4

Leukotriene C4 synthase deficiency is an inborn error of metabolism.

Deficiency of Leukotriene C4 synthase can lead to a reduction in Leukotriene C4.
