= 2,4-dienoyl-CoA reductase 1 =

Protein-coding gene in the species Homo sapiens

DECR1

Identifiers
- Aliases: DECR1, DECR, NADPH, SDR18C1, 2,4-dienoyl-CoA reductase 1, mitochondrial, 2,4-dienoyl-CoA reductase 1
- External IDs: OMIM: 222745; MGI: 1914710; GeneCards: DECR1
Available structures
PDB	Ortholog search: PDBe RCSB
PDB	List of PDB id codes 1W6U, 1W73, 1W8D
Enzyme activity
EC #	BRENDA	ExPASy	KEGG	MetaCyc
1.3.1.124	↗	↗	↗	↗

Gene location (Human)
Chr.	Chromosome 8 (human)
Band	8q21.3	Start	90,001,405 bp
Band	8q21.3	End	90,053,633 bp

Gene location (Mouse)
Chr.	Chromosome 4 (mouse)
Band	4|4 A2	Start	15,917,240 bp
Band	4|4 A2	End	15,945,507 bp
RNA expression pattern
Bgee	Human / Mouse (ortholog); Top expressed in: myocardium of left ventricle; right ventricle; right adrenal gland; right adrenal cortex; right lobe of liver; apex of heart; left adrenal gland; right auricle of heart; left adrenal cortex; mucosa of transverse colon / Top expressed in: right ventricle; myocardium of ventricle; interventricular septum; brown adipose tissue; cardiac muscles; cardiac muscle tissue of left ventricle; left lobe of liver; intercostal muscle; tunica adventitia of aorta; thoracic diaphragm; More reference expression data
BioGPS	n/a
Gene ontology
Molecular function	oxidoreductase activity, acting on NAD(P)H; oxidoreductase activity; 2,4-dienoyl-CoA reductase (NADPH) activity; NADPH binding
Cellular component	mitochondrial matrix; extracellular exosome; mitochondrion; nucleus; nucleoplasm; cytosol
Biological process	fatty acid beta-oxidation; protein homotetramerization; fatty acid metabolic process; lipid metabolism; positive regulation of cold-induced thermogenesis
Sources:Amigo / QuickGO
Orthologs
Databases	NCBI: entry; OMA: entry
Species	Human	Mouse
Entrez	1666	67460
Ensembl	ENSG00000104325	ENSMUSG00000028223
UniProt	Q16698	Q9CQ62
RefSeq (mRNA)	NM_001359; NM_001330575	NM_026172
RefSeq (protein)	NP_001317504; NP_001350	NP_080448
Location (UCSC)	Chr 8: 90 – 90.05 Mb	Chr 4: 15.92 – 15.95 Mb
PubMed search
- Wikidata
View/Edit Human	View/Edit Mouse

2,4-dienoyl-CoA reductase 1 is a protein that in humans is encoded by the DECR1 gene.

== Function ==
This gene encodes an accessory enzyme which participates in the beta-oxidation and metabolism of unsaturated fatty enoyl-CoA esters.

== See also ==
- DECR2
