= 2,4 Dienoyl-CoA reductase =

Class of enzymes

2,4-dienoyl CoA reductase 1, mitochondrial
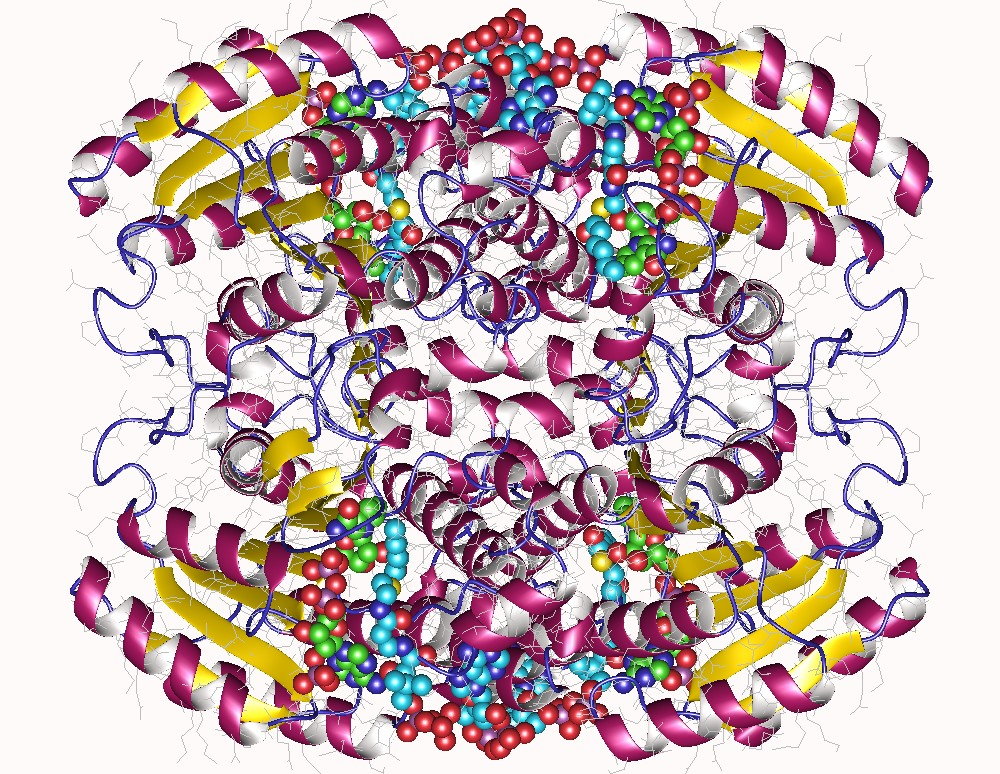
- DECR1, homotetramer, Human

Identifiers
- Symbol: DECR1
- Alt. symbols: DECR
- NCBI gene: 1666
- HGNC: 2753
- OMIM: 222745
- PDB: 1w6u
- RefSeq: NM_001359
- UniProt: Q16698

Other data
- EC number: 1.3.1.34
- Locus: Chr. 8 q21.3
Search for
- Structures: Swiss-model
- Domains: InterPro

2,4 Dienoyl-CoA reductase also known as DECR1 is an enzyme which in humans is encoded by the DECR1 gene which resides on chromosome 8. This enzyme catalyzes the following reactions

DECR1 participates in the beta oxidation and metabolism of polyunsaturated fatty enoyl-CoA esters. Specifically, it catalyzes the reduction of 2,4 dienoyl-CoA thioesters of varying length by NADPH cofactor to 3-trans-enoyl-CoA of equivalent length. Unlike the breakdown of saturated fat, cis and trans polyunsaturated fatty acid degradation requires three additional enzymes to generate a product compatible with the standard beta oxidation pathway. DECR is the second such enzyme (the others being enoyl CoA isomerase and dienoyl CoA isomerase) and is the rate limiting step in this auxiliary flow. DECR is capable of reducing both 2-trans,4-cis-dienoyl-CoA and 2-trans,4-trans-dienoyl-CoA thioesters with equal efficiency. This is unusual, since most enzymes are highly stereoselective or stereospecific. There is no clear explanation for DECR's of lack of stereospecificity.

== Structure ==
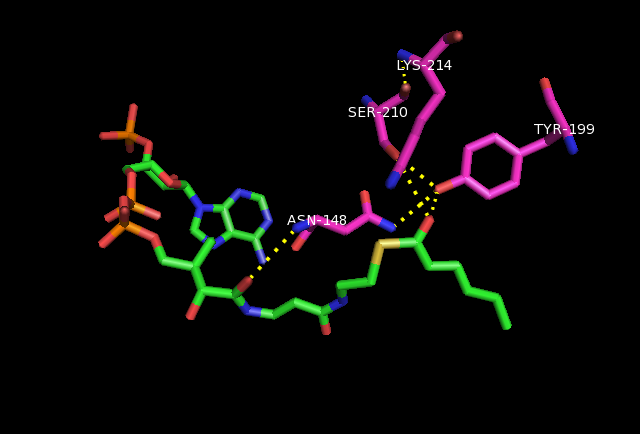
Crystallization of DECR with 2,4 Hexadienoyl-CoA and NADPH (not shown). Key residues in the enzyme active site orient the substrate for hydride transfer through a network of hydrogen bonds.

Eukaryotic DECR exists in both the mitochondria (mDECR) and the peroxisome (pDECR, coded by gene DECR2). The enzymes from each organelle are homologous and part of the short-chain dehydrogenase/reductase SDR super-family. mDECR is 124 kDa consisting of 335 amino acids before post-translational modification. The secondary structure shares many of the motifs of SDR, including a Rossmann fold for strong NADPH binding. The protein exists as a homotetramer in physiological environment, but has been shown to also form monomers and dimers in solution.

Crystallization of mDECR shows the enzyme provides a network of hydrogen bonds from key residues in the active site to NADPH and the 2,4-dienoyl-CoA which positions the hydride at 3.4 Å to the Cδ, compared with 4.0 Å to the Cβ (not shown). The enolate intermediate discussed earlier is stabilized by residues additional hydrogen bonds to Tyr166 and Asn148. Lys214 and Ser210 (conserved residues in all SDR enzymes) are thought to increase the pKa of Tyr166 and stabilize the transition state. Additionally, at one end of the active site there is a flexible loop that provides sufficient room for long carbon chains. This likely gives the enzyme flexibility to process fatty acid chains of various lengths. Substrate length for mDECR catalysis is thought to be limited at 20 carbons, at which this very long chain fatty acid is first partially oxidized by pDECR in the peroxisome.

== Enzyme mechanism ==
=== Eukaryotic DECR ===
2,4 Dienoyl-CoA thioester reduction by NADPH to 3-Enoyl CoA occurs by a two-step sequential mechanism via an enolate intermediate. DECR binds NADPH and the fatty acid thioester and positions them for specific hydride transfer to the Cδ on the hydrocarbon chain. The electrons from the Cγ-Cδ double bond move over to the Cβ-Cγ position, and those from the Cα-Cβ form an enolate. In the final step, a proton is abstracted from the water to the Cα and the thioester is reformed, resulting in a single Cβ-Cγ trans double bond. Since the final proton comes from water, the pH has a significant effect on the catalytic rate with the enzyme demonstrating maximal activity at ~6.0. A decrease in activity at pH < 6.0 can be explained by de-protonation of titratable residues that affect protein folding or substrate binding. Mutant proteins with modifications at key acidic amino acids (E154, E227, E276, D300, D117) show order of magnitude increases in K_{m} and/or decreases in V_{max}.

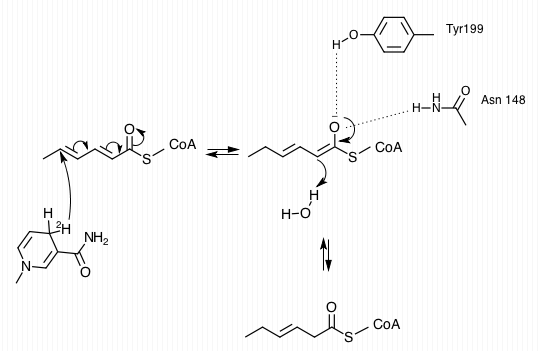
Proposed mechanism of 2,4-Trans dienoyl-CoA reduction by NADPH in mammalian DECR. The mechanism proceeds stepwise through an enolate intermediate.

=== Prokaryotic DECR ===
2,4 Dienoyl-CoA Reductase from Escherichia coli shares very similar kinetic properties to that of eukaryotes, but differs significantly in both structure and mechanism. In addition to NADPH, E. Coli DECR requires a set of FAD, FMN and iron–sulfur cluster molecules to complete the electron transfer. A further distinction is E. Coli DECR produces the final 2-trans-enoyl-CoA without the need for Enoyl CoA Isomerase. The active site contains accurately positioned Tyr166 that donates a proton to the Cγ after hydride attack at the Cδ, completing the reduction in a single concerted step. Surprisingly, mutation of the Tyr166 does not eliminate enzyme activity but instead changes the product to 3-trans-enoyl-CoA. The current explanation is that Glu164, an acidic residue in the active site, acts as a proton donor to Cα when Tyr166 is not present.

== Function ==
DECR is one of three auxiliary enzymes involved in a rate-limiting step of unsaturated fatty acid oxidation in mitochondria. In particular, this enzyme contributes to breaking the double bonds at all even-numbered positions, and some double bonds at odd-numbered position. The structure of the ternary complex of pDCR (peroxisomal 2,4-dienoyl CoA reductases) with NADP and its substrate provides essential and unique insights into the mechanism of catalysis. Unlike other members belonging to the SDR family, catalysis by pDCR does not involve a tyrosine-serine pair. Instead, a catalytically critical aspartate, together with an invariant lysine, polarizes a water molecule to donate a proton for the formation of the product. Although pDCR can use 2,4-hexadienoyl CoA as a substrate, the affinities for short chain fatty acids are lower. Analysis of the hinge movement of DCRs from the mitochondrion and peroxisomes sheds light on the reason behind the unique ability of the peroxisome to shorten very long chain fatty acids.

== Clinical significance ==
Mutations in the DECR1 gene may result in 2,4 Dienoyl-CoA reductase deficiency, a rare but lethal disorder.

Due to its role in fatty acid oxidation, DECR may serve as a therapeutic target for treating non-insulin dependent diabetes mellitus (NIDDM), which features hyperglycemia due to increased fatty acid oxidation.

In knockout mice studies, DECR1^{−/−} subjects accumulate significant concentrations of mono and polyunsaturated fatty acids in the liver during fasting (such as oleic acid, palmitoleic acid, linoleic acid, and linolenic acid). Mutant subjects were also found to have poor tolerance to cold, decrease in diurnal activity, and an overall reduction in adaptation to metabolic stressors.

== See also ==
- Beta oxidation
- 2,4-dienoyl-CoA reductase 1
