= Metab-L =

Logo of the Metab-L Mailing list

Metab-L is an electronic mailing list on inborn errors of metabolism (IEM) that has acquired notability among specialists in that field of medicine, especially from the area of pediatrics.

The non-commercial, international, English-language list is a basis of specialist exchange and cooperation with an emphasis on promoting an "IEM community". The list is restricted to medical professionals and scientists involved in metabolic diseases.

Metab-L threads cover a broad range of topics including workshop information, project discussion, address exchanges, laboratory assays, scientific literature, job opportunities and technical questions with an important focus on clinical topics - discussion and shared evidence of intriguing and rare cases, general treatment of certain disorders of metabolism and general diagnostic principles.

== Short History ==
Metab-L was started in August 1995 by a clinical pediatrician, Dr. med. Christian Renner, then Erlangen, now Deggendorf, Germany, at a time when the idea of using the Internet for a direct and group-based information exchange among medical specialists in a very small field of medical science, distributed all over the world, was still something innovative and unusual for the prospected membership.

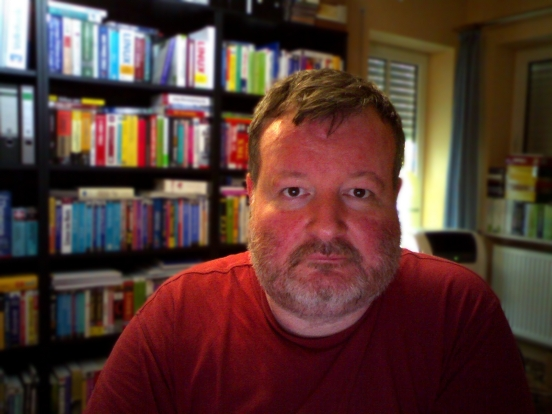
Christian Renner, MD

Based on his very own needs and difficulties in contacting diagnostic and clinical specialists and discussing with them his own cases where rare metabolic disorders were assumed or had to be treated Renner romantically spent long nightly hours manually searching through treasured paper address lists and notes, some of them hand written and handed-down, wilted and arcane, to send unsolicited snail mail to colleagues and metabolic specialists distributed all over the world inviting them to join in (bolstering the endeavour by posting announcements of Metab-L to Usenet newsgroups). The main impetus - and a main achievement - of the mailing list was to overcome a certain degree of till then almost unavoidable professional isolation encountered in the face of extremely low prevalences and patient numbers in certain inborn metabolic diseases, by means of computer-mediated, group- and community-focused communication.

Technically Metab-L has been based on mailing list software running on servers of the KNF computer club. Being non-commercial and "open-source-like", generous, unconditional and long-term financial support by two metabolics-interested companies, Milupa GmbH, Germany, now Nutricia Metabolics, Danone GmbH Germany, (ongoing) and Orphan Europe Germany (until October 2013) were essential and helpful almost from the very beginning.

== Notability and impact ==
Despite its homemade basis, rustic origin and initially one-man approach, metabolic professionals from all over the world quickly joined in the project. Metab-L soon became and today is a major and acknowledged instrument for specialists in the "Inborn Error Community" worldwide.

Though simple in idea and technical design - and low in traffic volume (about 1 to 10 postings a day) - it has become quite a unique phenomenon in the area of Inborn Errors of Metabolism: By December 2025 (in its 30th year) Metab-L had a subscription base of over 2200 subscribers worldwide, which is still growing on an almost daily basis. Although of initially European-German origin, Metab-L members today come mainly from the US and the UK with growing participation by scientists from all parts of the world. Inborn error of metabolism specialists taking part in Metab-L are mostly clinicians/ pediatricians or coming from a biochemical and laboratory professional or geneticist background. A great portion of members of the most important metabolic scientific societies, SSIEM and SIMD, regularly participate in Metab-L discussions. The renowned Journal of Inherited Metabolic Disease now explicitly publishes "summaries of contributions e.g. to the metabolic Email list metab-l" and in other places, as well, Metab-L is regularly cited in scientific literature: Example articles with Metab-L citation.

The mailing list archives - accessible for members via a WWW-interface- reflect scientific and clinical discussion and developments with regard to inborn errors of metabolism since August 1995.
