= Inborn errors of purine–pyrimidine metabolism =

- Specialty: Endocrinology

Inborn errors of purine–pyrimidine metabolism are a class of inborn error of metabolism disorders specifically affecting purine metabolism and pyrimidine metabolism. An example is Lesch–Nyhan syndrome.

Urine tests may be of use in identifying some of these disorders.
