= Bonjela =

Medicated oral gel

Bonjela packaging

Bonjela is a brand of oral treatments intended to relieve the pain of mouth ulcers and denture sores. The brand covers a range of products. Bonjela Adult and Cool are oral gels containing keratolytic and mildly antiseptic salicylic acid in the form of its salt choline salicylate and the antiseptic cetalkonium chloride as active ingredients.

== Products ==
Both products are suitable only for people aged 16 or over because of a possible association between salicylates and Reye syndrome.

This formulation is also sold in Australia as Bonjela Teething Gel, for the treatment of teething pain in babies. Bonjela Teething Gel in the UK and Ireland, however, is a different formulation, as salicylate-based products cannot be used in under-16s in the UK. This formulation of Bonjela Teething Gel contains the local anesthetic lidocaine and the antiseptic cetalkonium chloride.

The range also includes Bonjela Complete Plus, which acts by forming a protective barrier over the ulcer.

Bonjela is distributed by Reckitt Healthcare and is available in the United Kingdom, France, Ireland, South Africa, Nigeria, Australia, New Zealand, Singapore, Malaysia, Hong Kong, Thailand, Pakistan, and many Caribbean countries (such as Trinidad and Tobago).
