= Douglas Reye =

Australian pathologist

Ralph Douglas Kenneth Reye (/raɪ/ "rye"; 5 April 1912 – 16 July 1977) was an Australian pathologist. In 1958, he discovered a muscular disease that was later named nemaline myopathy. A brain disease he and his colleagues described in 1963 is eponymously known as Reye syndrome.

== Life and career ==
Reye was born in Townsville, Queensland, Australia, in a German immigrant family. He attended Townsville Grammar School and the University of Sydney, where he completed undergraduate studies in medicine and was awarded a MBBS in 1937. He was later awarded an MD from the University of Sydney in 1945. Reye joined the staff of the Royal Alexandra Hospital for Children (RAHC) in 1939 as a pathologist, and remained there for all his working life. In 1965, Reye was elected as a Fellow of the Royal Australasian College of Physicians. On 16 July 1977, Reye died at the age of 65, of a ruptured abdominal aortic aneurysm at Royal North Shore Hospital, 24 hours after he had retired from the RAHC.

== Contributions ==
=== Nemaline myopathy ===
In 1958, Reye identified a disease that involved muscular weakness in which the muscle fibres appeared as thick threads or rods. He did not publish his discovery as it was argued that the microscopic observations could be artefacts. Later known as nemaline myopathy, the medical condition was established independently by American researchers P.E. Cohen and G. M. Shy in 1963.

=== Reye syndrome ===
In 1963, Reye, Graeme Morgan, and Jim Baral reported a kind of brain disease in The Lancet. The disease was later known as Reye syndrome.
