= SLC22A5 =

Protein-coding gene in the species Homo sapiens

Identifiers
- Aliases: SLC22A5, CDSP, OCTN2, solute carrier family 22 member 5
- External IDs: OMIM: 603377; MGI: 1329012; GeneCards: SLC22A5

Gene location (Human)
Chr.	Chromosome 5 (human)
Band	5q31.1	Start	132,369,710 bp
Band	5q31.1	End	132,395,613 bp

Gene location (Mouse)
Chr.	Chromosome 11 (mouse)
Band	11 B1.3|11 32.02 cM	Start	53,755,368 bp
Band	11 B1.3|11 32.02 cM	End	53,782,486 bp
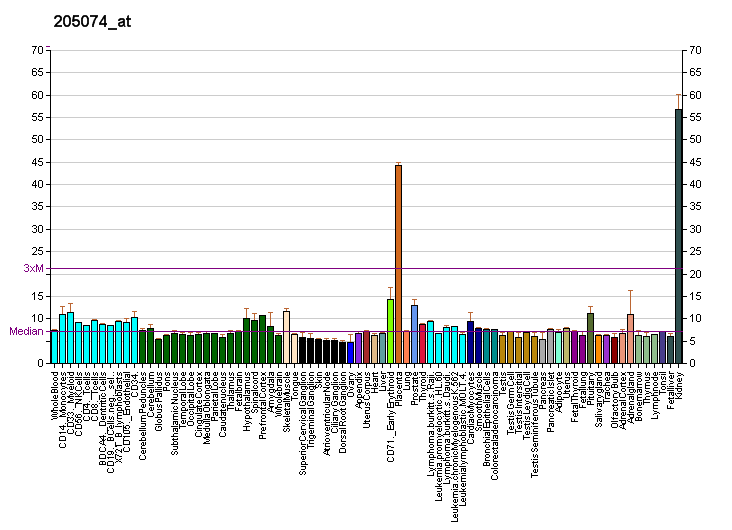
RNA expression pattern
Bgee	Human / Mouse (ortholog); Top expressed in: gastrocnemius muscle; mucosa of transverse colon; mucosa of ileum; jejunal mucosa; muscle of thigh; right uterine tube; human kidney; right hemisphere of cerebellum; apex of heart; tibialis anterior muscle / Top expressed in: right kidney; human kidney; proximal tubule; duodenum; decidua; spermatocyte; choroid plexus of fourth ventricle; muscle of thigh; spermatid; blastocyst; More reference expression data
BioGPS	More reference expression data
Gene ontology
Molecular function	nucleotide binding; PDZ domain binding; transmembrane transporter activity; transporter activity; protein binding; quaternary ammonium group transmembrane transporter activity; symporter activity; ATP binding; xenobiotic transmembrane transporter activity; organic anion transmembrane transporter activity; carnitine transmembrane transporter activity
Cellular component	integral component of membrane; membrane; plasma membrane; integral component of plasma membrane; brush border membrane; apical plasma membrane; extracellular exosome
Biological process	sodium ion transport; quaternary ammonium group transport; ion transport; sodium-dependent organic cation transport; positive regulation of intestinal epithelial structure maintenance; carnitine transport; carnitine metabolic process; xenobiotic transmembrane transport; transmembrane transport; organic anion transport; carnitine transmembrane transport; transport; xenobiotic transport
Sources:Amigo / QuickGO
Orthologs
Databases	NCBI: entry; OMA: entry
Species	Human	Mouse
Entrez	6584	20520
Ensembl	ENSG00000197375	ENSMUSG00000018900
UniProt	O76082	Q9Z0E8
RefSeq (mRNA)	NM_001308122; NM_003060	NM_011396; NM_001362711; NM_001362712
RefSeq (protein)	NP_001295051; NP_003051	NP_035526; NP_001349640; NP_001349641
Location (UCSC)	Chr 5: 132.37 – 132.4 Mb	Chr 11: 53.76 – 53.78 Mb
PubMed search
- Wikidata
View/Edit Human	View/Edit Mouse

SLC22A5 is a membrane transport protein associated with primary carnitine deficiency. This protein is involved in the active cellular uptake of carnitine. It acts a symporter, moving sodium ions and other organic cations across the membrane along with carnitine. Such polyspecific organic cation transporters in the liver, kidney, intestine, and other organs are critical for the elimination of many endogenous small organic cations as well as a wide array of drugs and environmental toxins. Mutations in the SLC22A5 gene cause systemic primary carnitine deficiency, which can lead to heart failure.

== Structure ==
The SLC22A5 gene, containing 10 exons, is located on the q arm of chromosome 5 in position 31.1 and spans 25,910 base pair. The gene produces a 63 kDa protein composed of 557 amino acids. The protein has 12 transmembrane helices (TM, with a long extracellular loop of 107 amino acids between the first two transmembrane domains and an intracellular loop between . This long extracellular loop has three potential sites for N-glycosylation, and the intracellular loop has an ATP/GTP binding motif. In putative intracellular domains, there are five potential sites for protein-kinase C-dependent phosphorylation and one for protein-kinase A-dependent phosphorylation. Cryo-EM structures confirm that SLC22A5/OCTN2 adopts the major facilitator superfamily fold and identify separate binding sites for a sodium ion and carnitine.

== Function ==
The SLC22A5 gene codes for a plasma integral membrane protein which functions as both an organic cation transporter and a sodium-dependent high affinity carnitine transporter. The encoded protein is involved in the active cellular uptake of carnitine, transporting one sodium ion with one molecule of carnitine. Organic cations transported by this protein include tetraethylammonium (TEA) without involvement of sodium. The relative uptake activity ratio of carnitine to TEA is 11.3.

== Clinical Significance ==
The main phenotypical effect of autosomal recessive mutations, either compound heterozygous or homozygous, in the SLC22A5 gene is systemic primary carnitine deficiency, characterized by impaired carnitine transport, urinary carnitine wasting, low serum carnitine levels, reduced intracellular carnitine accumulation, impaired beta oxidation, and cytosolic fatty acid accumulation. Patients often display metabolic decompensation, hypoketotic hypoglycemia, hepatic encephalopathy, Reye syndrome, and sudden infant death in their first year, followed by the later onset of cardiomyopathy or skeletal myopathy, arrhythmias, muscle weakness, and heart failure in early childhood. Patients may be asymptomatic, with about 70% of asymptomatic patients having a missense mutation or in-frame deletion; nonsense mutation frequency is increased in symptomatic patients. The symptoms and outcome of the disease can be drastically improved by replacement therapy with L-carnitine. The estimated incidence of primary carnitine deficiency in newborns is about 1 in 40,000.

== Interactions ==
SLC22A5 interacts with PDZK1.

== See also ==
- Solute carrier family
