= Cetalkonium chloride =

Names
- Preferred IUPAC name N-Benzyl-N,N-dimethylhexadecan-1-aminium chloride
- Other names Benzyldimethylhexadecylammonium chloride; 16-BAC; Benzyldimethyl-n-hexadecylammonium chloride; Cetyldimethylbenzylammonium chloride

Identifiers
CAS Number	122-18-9
3D model (JSmol)	Interactive image
ChemSpider	28943
ECHA InfoCard	100.004.116
EC Number	204-526-3
PubChem CID	31202
UNII	85474O1N9D
UN number	3261
CompTox Dashboard (EPA)	DTXSID3041665
- InChI: InChI=1S/C25H46N.ClH/c1-4-5-6-7-8-9-10-11-12-13-14-15-16-20-23-26(2,3)24-25-21-18-17-19-22-25;/h17-19,21-22H,4-16,20,23-24H2,1-3H3;1H/q+1;/p-1 Key: SXPWTBGAZSPLHA-UHFFFAOYSA-M; InChI=1/C25H46N.ClH/c1-4-5-6-7-8-9-10-11-12-13-14-15-16-20-23-26(2,3)24-25-21-18-17-19-22-25;/h17-19,21-22H,4-16,20,23-24H2,1-3H3;1H/q+1;/p-1 Key: SXPWTBGAZSPLHA-REWHXWOFAX
- SMILES: CCCCCCCCCCCCCCCC[N+](C)(C)CC1=CC=CC=C1.[Cl-]

Properties
Chemical formula	C_{25}H_{46}ClN
Molar mass	396.10 g·mol^{−1}
Appearance	A white or almost white crystalline powder
Density	approx. 0.4
Melting point	50°C
Solubility in water	2mg/mL
Solubility	alcohols, acetone, ethyl acetate, propylene glycol, sorbitol solutions, glycerol ether, triglycerides, mineral oils

Hazards
- GHS labelling
Pictograms	(GHS05: Corrosive) (GHS07: Exclamation mark) (GHS09: Environmental hazard)
Hazard statements	H302, H312, H314, H400
Precautionary statements	P262, P273, P280, P305+P351+P338, P310, P501
- Lethal dose or concentration (LD, LC)
LD_{50} (median dose)	> 500mg/kg (oral, rat)
Safety data sheet (SDS)	FeF Chemical (archive.org)
- Except where otherwise noted, data are given for materials in their standard state (at 25 °C [77 °F], 100 kPa). Infobox references

Cetalkonium chloride (CKC) is a quaternary ammonium compound of the alkyl-benzyldimethylammonium chloride family, the alkyl group having a chain length of C16 (16 carbons). It is used in pharmaceutical products either as an excipient (Cationorm, Retaine MGD) or as an active ingredient (Bonjela, Pansoral). It may be found in very small amount in the excipient benzalkonium chloride mixture (typically less than 5% of the total mixture). Cetalkonium chloride is purchased as a raw material in dry form as a white powder.

== Applications ==
Cetalkonium chloride can be used in different applications depending on its concentration.

=== Anti-infective agent ===
It can be used as an active ingredient to relieve the pain of mouth ulcers and denture sores in buccal solutions or gels such as Pansoral or in Bonjela. The usual concentration in these products is 0.01% (w/w). However, it isn't known as a potent bactericidal compound, mainly because of its low solubility in water. For example, US and European pharmacopeias enforce suppliers of benzalkonium chloride to limit the amount of cetalkonium chloride in the mixture to less than 5% w/w.

=== Cationic surface-active agent ===
Cetalkonium chloride can also be used as a pharmaceutical excipient due to its amphiphilic property and cationic charge. For example, it has recently been included in a contact lens to bind an anionic active drug to serve as reservoir and extend the release rate of the molecule. Most frequently, it is used as an emulsifier and cationic agent in ophthalmic nanoemulsions in products like Cationorm and Retaine MGD. Due to its high lipophilicity, cetalkonium chloride is strongly associated to oil nanodroplets at the oil/water interface in oil-in-water emulsions, hence providing a positive charge at the surface of the oil nanodroplets. This polarization of the nanodroplets stabilizes the emulsion by creating an electrostatic repulsion between the nanodroplets and is the driving force behind the biological adhesion of the nanodroplets to negatively charged cell epithelium in vivo. In life science the cationic charge of cetalkonium is used to separate biological extracts according to their charge.

=== Biological activity ===
Biological activity of cetalkonium chloride as excipient has been widely described in the scientific literature. Cetalkonium chloride acts by creating a positive charge that provides bioadhesive properties of the cationic nanoemulsions on the negatively charged ocular surface. Hence, increasing the penetration of active ingredients formulated in cationic nanoemulsions into ocular tissues. Even more, cetalkonium chloride cationic emulsions seem to improve healing of corneal lesions.

== Safety ==
Even though cetalkonium chloride belongs to the family of benzalkonium chloride, the ophthalmic use of cetalkonium chloride cationic nanoemulsions have been shown to be safe. These observations are explained by the fact that cetalkonium chloride present in oil-in-water emulsions is bound to the oil nanodroplets therefore sequestered from the water phase and not available to cause damages to ocular tissues. Pansoral has been on the market since 1981 and Cationorm since 2008, both products being well accepted by patients.

== Regulatory ==
Cetalkonium is listed on the FDA OTC ingredient list updated April 2010. The MHRA has published in 2012 the "Consolidated list of substances which are present in authorized medicines for general sale" in which CKC is cited. The highest authorized concentration is 0.1% when administered topically and in the mouth.
