= 3-hydroxyacyl-coenzyme A dehydrogenase deficiency =

- Other names: HADH deficiency

3-hydroxyacyl-coenzyme A dehydrogenase deficiency is a rare condition that prevents the body from converting certain fats to energy, particularly during fasting. Normally, through a process called fatty acid oxidation, several enzymes work in a step-wise fashion to metabolize fats and convert them to energy. People with 3-hydroxyacyl-coenzyme A dehydrogenase deficiency have inadequate levels of an enzyme required for a step that metabolizes groups of fats called medium chain fatty acids and short chain fatty acids; for this reason this disorder is sometimes called medium- and short-chain 3-hydroxyacyl-coenzyme A dehydrogenase (M/SCHAD) deficiency.

== Signs and symptoms ==
Typically, initial signs and symptoms of this disorder occur during infancy or early childhood and can include poor appetite, vomiting, diarrhea, lethargy, hypoglycemia, hypotonia, liver problems, and hyperinsulinism (high levels of insulin). Insulin controls the amount of sugar that moves from the blood into cells for conversion to energy. Individuals with 3-hydroxyacyl-coenzyme A dehydrogenase deficiency are also at risk for complications such as seizures, life-threatening heart and breathing problems, coma, and sudden unexpected death.

Problems related to 3-hydroxyacyl-coenzyme A dehydrogenase deficiency can be triggered by periods of fasting or by illnesses such as viral infections. This disorder is sometimes mistaken for Reye syndrome, a severe disorder that may develop in children while they appear to be recovering from viral infections such as chicken pox or flu. Most cases of Reye syndrome are associated with the use of aspirin during these viral infections.

== Genetics ==
Mutations in the HADH gene lead to inadequate levels of an enzyme called 3-hydroxyacyl-coenzyme A dehydrogenase. Medium-chain and short-chain fatty acids cannot be metabolized and processed properly without sufficient levels of this enzyme. As a result, these fatty acids are not converted to energy, which can lead to characteristic features of this disorder, such as lethargy and hypoglycemia. Medium-chain and short-chain fatty acids or partially metabolized fatty acids may build up in tissues and damage the liver, heart, and muscles, causing more serious complications.

This condition is inherited in an autosomal recessive pattern, which means two copies of the gene in each cell are altered. Most often, the parents of an individual with an autosomal recessive disorder each carry one copy of the altered gene but do not show signs and symptoms of the disorder.

== See also ==
- Inborn error of lipid metabolism
