= 2,4 Dienoyl-CoA reductase deficiency =

- Other names: DECRD
- Reaction catalyzed by 2,4-dienoyl-CoA reductase (EC 1.3.1.34) on (2E,4Z)-dienoyl-CoA.
- Specialty: Medical genetics

2,4 Dienoyl-CoA reductase deficiency is an inborn error of metabolism resulting in defective fatty acid oxidation caused by a deficiency of the enzyme 2,4 Dienoyl-CoA reductase. Lysine degradation is also affected in this disorder leading to hyperlysinemia. The disorder is inherited in an autosomal recessive manner, meaning an individual must inherit mutations in NADK2, located at 5p13.2 from both of their parents. NADK2 encodes the mitochondrial NAD kinase. A defect in this enzyme leads to deficient mitochondrial nicotinamide adenine dinucleotide phosphate levels. 2,4 Dienoyl-CoA reductase, but also lysine degradation are performed by NADP-dependent oxidoreductases explaining how NADK2 deficiency can lead to multiple enzyme defects.

2,4-Dienoyl-CoA reductase deficiency was initially described in 1990 based on a single case of a black female who presented with persistent hypotonia. Laboratory investigations revealed elevated lysine, low levels of carnitine and an abnormal acylcarnitine profile in urine and blood. The abnormal acylcarnitine species was eventually identified as 2-trans,4-cis-decadienoylcarnitine, an intermediate of linoleic acid metabolism. The index case died of respiratory failure at four months of age. Postmortem enzyme analysis on liver and muscle samples revealed decreased 2,4-dienoyl-CoA reductase activity when compared to normal controls. A second case with failure to thrive, developmental delay, lactic acidosis and severe encephalopathy was reported in 2014.

2,4-Dienoyl-CoA reductase deficiency was included as a secondary condition in the American College of Medical Genetics Recommended Uniform Panel for newborn screening. Its status as a secondary condition means there was not enough evidence of benefit to include it as a primary target, but it may be detected during the screening process or as part of a differential diagnosis when detecting conditions included as primary target. Despite its inclusion in newborn screening programs in several states for a number of years, no cases have been identified via neonatal screening.
