= Enoyl-CoA isomerase =

Type of enzyme

Δ^{3}-Δ^{2}-Enoyl-CoA isomerase
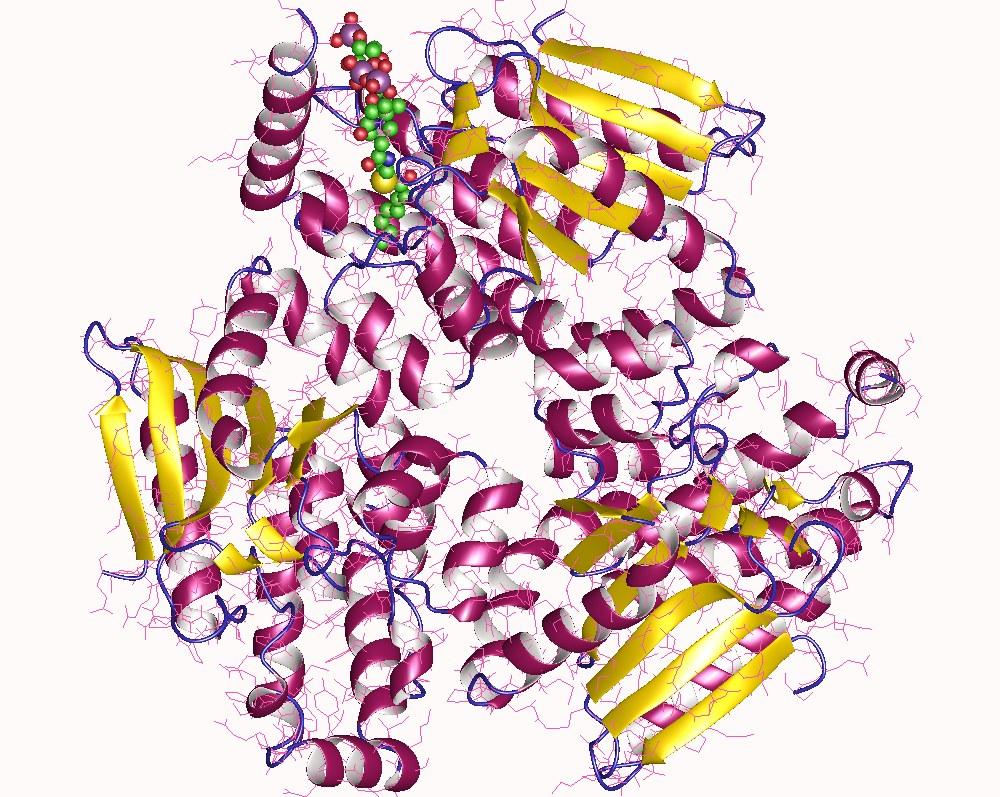
- 3,2-trans-enoyl-CoA isomerase trimer, Human

Identifiers
- EC no.: 5.3.3.8
- CAS no.: 62213-29-0

Databases
- IntEnz: IntEnz view
- BRENDA: BRENDA entry
- ExPASy: NiceZyme view
- KEGG: KEGG entry
- MetaCyc: metabolic pathway
- PRIAM: profile
- PDB structures: RCSB PDB PDBe PDBsum
- Gene Ontology: AmiGO / QuickGO
Search
- PMC: articles
- PubMed: articles
- NCBI: proteins

Enoyl-CoA-(∆) isomerase (EC 5.3.3.8, also known as dodecenoyl-CoA-(∆) isomerase, 3,2-trans-enoyl-CoA isomerase, ∆3(cis),∆2(trans)-enoyl-CoA isomerase, or acetylene-allene isomerase, is an enzyme that catalyzes the conversion of cis- or trans-double bonds of coenzyme A (CoA) bound fatty acids at gamma-carbon (position 3) to trans double bonds at beta-carbon (position 2) as below:

This enzyme has an important role in the metabolism of unsaturated fatty acids in beta oxidation.

== Mechanism ==
Figure 1: Reaction Mechanism of Enoyl-CoA Isomerase

Enoyl-CoA isomerase is involved in the beta-oxidation, one of the most frequently used pathways in fatty acid degradation, of unsaturated fatty acids with double bonds at odd-numbered carbon positions. It does so by shifting the position of the double bonds in the acyl-CoA intermediates and converting 3-cis or trans-enoyl-CoA to 2-trans-enoyl-CoA. Since the key step in the degradation of fatty acids with double bonds at even-numbered carbon positions also produces 3-trans-enoyl-CoA in mammals and yeasts, enoyl-CoA isomerase is technically required for their metabolism as well. The reaction mechanism is detailed in figure 1, and the base that initiates the isomerization and NH groups that stabilize the intermediate are located on the active site of enoyl-coA isomerase.

As it functions in the step immediately preceding the actual beta-oxidation and forms a double bond extending from the beta-carbon (position 2), enoyl-CoA isomerase is involved in both the NADPH-dependent and NADPH-independent pathways of beta-oxidation. The double bond serves as the target of oxidation and carbon-to-carbon bond cleavage, thereby shortening the fatty acid chain.

== Sub-classification ==
Enoyl-CoA isomerases can be categorized into three classes:

- monofunctional mitochondrial
- monofunctional peroxisomal
- multifunctional

The monofunctional mitochondrial and peroxisomal enzymes are found in the mitochondria and peroxisomes of eukaryotes, respectively. The multifunctional enzymes are found in bacteria and in the peroxisomes of some eukaryotes, but they serve two functions: the N-terminal domain works the same as the other classes of enoyl-CoA isomerases and the C-terminal domain works as a dehydrogenase, specifically, to 3-hydroxyactyl-CoA. There are two divisions among the mitochondrial enoyl Co-A isomerase: short-chain and long-chain [4]. In an immunoblot, antibodies were run against all enoyl CoA isomerase. However, two of these isomerases had antibody attachment: the short chain isomerase and the peroxisomal multifunctional enzyme. There was one enzyme which did not have binding specificity to this antibody: mitochondrial long-chain isomerase. Long-chain isomerase was found when it eluted at a lower potassium phosphate concentration in the gradient. Thus, the discovery of three sub-classes of enoyl CoA isomerase was made.

Although all three classes of enzymes have the same function, there is little overlap among their amino acid sequences. For example, only 40 out of 302 amino acid sequences (13%) are the same between monofunctional peroxisomal and mitochondrial enzymes in humans. In fact, in mammals, the peroxisomal enzyme has an extra N-terminal domain that is not present in the mitochondrial counterpart. Also, it has been found to be a subunit of the peroxisomal trifunctional enzyme (pTFE) and contributes only to minor cleavages of the fatty acid chain. In that sense, for many higher organisms, the mitochondrial enzyme is essential for deriving maximum energy from lipids and fueling muscles.

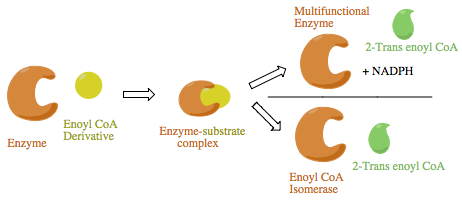
If the enzyme is unclear, react it with an enoyl CoA Derivative. If the enzyme gives off more than one product, it is a multifunctional enzyme. If it gives off one product, it is solely enoyl Co-Al isomerase.

Mitochondria (both short- and long-chain) of rat liver contain more than one enoyl Co-A isomerase. To further support the idea that short- and long-chain isomerases elute at different concentration of potassium phosphate concentration, they do not share similar primary polypeptide structure, hence they must not be evolutionarily related. Peroxisomes of plants and of rat liver are very different in the way they operate. Despite their primary structure similarities, there are differences among the different specimen. To begin with, the peroxisomes of rat liver are a multifunctional enzyme including enoyl-CoA isomerase, enoyl-CoA hydratase, and L-(−)-3-hydroxyacyl-CoA dehydrogenase. Three different enzymes reside on this entity (multifunctional protein) allowing this enzyme to perform isomerization, hydration, and dehydration. Isomerase activity on the multifunctional enzyme occurs at the amino-terminal catalytic half of the protein along with the hydratase activity. The dehydrogenase activity of enoyl-CoA occurs in the carboxyl-terminal. Upon further investigation of the CoA binding site on the amino-terminal half of the multifunctional protein, the CoA substrate is not transferred through the aqueous phase from the isomerization phase to the site of hydration or does not have a bulk phase. This removes the need for a substrate transferring enzyme. On the other hand, the cotyledons convert long-chain 3-trans-enoyl-CoA, long-chain 3-cis-enoyl-CoA, and short-chain 3-cis-enoyl-CoA species into their 2- trans-enoyl-CoA respective forms. As previously mentioned, plant enoyl-CoA isomerase exclusively forms the 2-trans isomer as product. It does not act on 4-cis-enoyl-CoA species or 2-trans- 4-trans-dienoyl-CoA species. In comparing the products of the plant peroxisome and the multifunctional enzyme of rat liver, the plant has no hydratase activity. The Plant form did not form a 2-cis-isomer (from enoyl-CoA hydratase) or D- or L- 3 hydroxy derivative (L-(−)-3-hydroxyacyl-CoA dehydrogenase): products of multifunctional enzyme of rat liver. The turnover rates of these the two sub divisions of peroxisomes are very different. The Kcat/Km ratio in cotyledons is 10^6 M-1s-1 which outperforms the ratio .07 * 10^6 M-1s-1. Due to a high turnover rate, the plant peroxisomes contain a lesser amount of enoyl-CoA isomerase than their counterparts in the rat liver.

In rat liver, mitochondrial enoyl CoA isomerase and peroxisomal enoyl CoA isomerase embedded in the multifunctional enzyme have similarities in the primary structure sequence. When comparing the amino-terminal half of E. coli against the amino-terminal half of rat liver, there were primary and secondary structure similarities towards the middle of the amino-terminal end. This conserved region must be important for structure and function of this specific enzyme since showing equally in both E. coli and rat liver.

== Structure ==
All classes of enoyl-CoA isomerases belong to a family of enzymes, the hydratase/isomerase or crotonase superfamily, and when examined with x-ray crystallography, exhibit a common structural feature of the family, the N-terminal core with a spiral fold composed of four turns, each turn consisting of two beta-sheets and one alpha-helix.

In enoyl-CoA isomerase, the two beta-sheets are part of the catalytic site, since the NH groups of residues following the beta-sheets attach to the carbonyl oxygen of the acyl-CoA intermediate. The formation of this oxyanion hole stabilizes the transition state of the enzyme-catalyzed reaction.

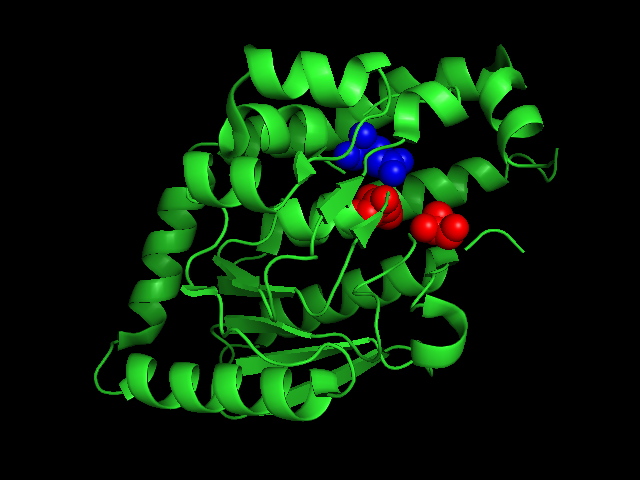
Figure 2: Catalytic Sites of Enoyl-CoA Isomerase in Yeast

Moreover, a glutamate residue located next to body cavities filled with water molecules and lined with hydrophobic or apolar side chains has also been identified as a part of the catalytic site. In its deprotonated form, the glutamate can act as a base and remove a proton from the acyl-CoA intermediate. The body cavities aid in rearranging the glutamate side chain to retain the proton and later deliver it back to the acyl-CoA, on a different carbon position.

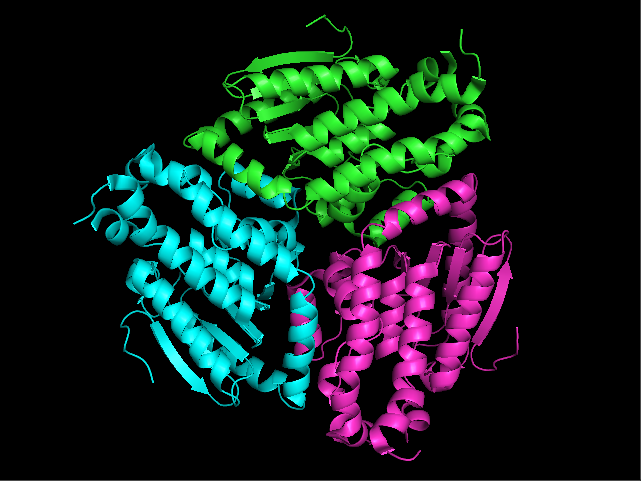
Figure 3: Trimer Disk of Enoyl-CoA Isomerase in Yeast

The NH-containing residues have been identified as Ala70 and Leu126 and the glutamate as Glu158 in peroxisomal enzymes in a yeast species, Saccharomyces cerevisiae. Their relative locations on the enzyme can be compared in figure 2.

The enzymes of the hydratase/isomerase or crotonase superfamily are typically trimeric disks dimerized into hexamers. The wide range of their substrate-enzyme specificity derives from the variations in the distances between the trimeric disks and their orientation. However, the human mitochondrial enoyl-CoA isomerase is a trimer and orients the fatty acid tail in a completely different direction from that seen in the hexamers. The trimeric disk of peroxisomal enzymes in Saccharomyces cerevisiae is displayed in figure 3.

== History ==
Enoyl-CoA isomerase was first identified and purified from rat liver mitochondria in the 1960s and 1970s via gel filtration and ion exchange chromatography. Since then, all classes of enoyl-CoA isomerase, mitochondrial, peroxisomal and multifunctional, have been identified in different organisms, including more mammals, plants, and unicellular organisms.

By 1994, using the rat enoyl-CoA isomerase cDNA as a hybridization probe, human enoyl-CoA isomerase cDNA could be sequenced and cloned. In the same year, the protein itself was isolated, not by affinity to rat antibody or cDNA probes, but by copurification with a transferase, human glutathione S-transferases.

In the attempts to examine the human enoyl-CoA isomerase in detail, the mitochondrial enzyme in the mammalian liver was identified as a potential biological marker for metabolic diseases due to its elevated levels in defective cells, and linked defects in fatty acid beta-oxidation to human diseases, to be specified in the next section.

== Clinical significance ==
In humans, defects in the beta-oxidation mechanism result in hypoketotic hyperglycemia, a symptom of starvation, due to the inefficient utilization of fatty acids as a primary source of energy. The metabolic disease was found to be on a genetic level: rats without the genes for enoyl-CoA isomerase also displayed high blood glucose level. Moreover, a biological marker for this condition may have been identified as the urine of these rats included high concentrations of medium chain unsaturated dicarboxylic acids, a condition called dicarboxylic aciduria.

More recent studies link hepatitis C virus (HCV) infection to defects in fatty acid degradation, specifically, to that in enoyl-CoA isomerase. HCV is the leading cause of chronic hepatitis, cirrhosis, and liver cancer, and more than 180 million people are affected globally. Due to the prolonged latency of the virus and no existing cures to rid the virus specifically, HCV is a serious problem that is causing more deaths than HIV/AIDS in the United States, but its threat still do not receive adequate attention. The need for a HCV-specific treatment is essential, and according to John Ward, the director of the CDC Hepatitis Division, it can save up to 120,000 lives.

According to protein profiling in the human liver biopsies of HCV patients, a correlation was initially discovered between dysfunctional mitochondrial processes, which include beta-oxidation, and HCV. As a matter of fact, lipids play an important role in the replication cycle of HCV, and in the "in vivo" samples from HCV patients, many lipids were found in abundance to aid HCV in virus uptake, RNA replication, and secretion from host cells. Enzymes that regulate fatty acid metabolism, including enoyl-CoA isomerase, were also similarly upregulated. Gene silencing techniques revealed that enoyl-CoA isomerase is essential in HCV RNA replication, and opened ways to stop HCV infection on an intracellular level.

== See also ==
- Fatty acid metabolism
- Isomerase
- 2,4-dienoyl-CoA reductase 1
