= Amino acid transport disorder =

- Specialty: Nephrology

Amino acid transport disorders are medical conditions associated with a failure of amino acids to be absorbed from the kidney or intestine.

An example is Hartnup disease.
