= Short-chain acyl-coenzyme A dehydrogenase deficiency =

- Other names: ACADS deficiency and SCAD deficiency,
- Short-chain acyl-coenzyme A dehydrogenase deficiency has an autosomal recessive pattern of inheritance.
- Symptoms: Cardiomyopathy, delayed speech
- Causes: Mutations in the ACADS gene
- Diagnostic method: Urine test, Genetic test
- Treatment: Intravenous fluids/ high dextrose concentration

Short-chain acyl-coenzyme A dehydrogenase deficiency (SCADD) is an autosomal recessive fatty acid oxidation disorder which affects enzymes required to break down a certain group of fats called short chain fatty acids.

== Signs and symptoms ==
Short-chain acyl-coenzyme A dehydrogenase deficiency affected infants will have vomiting, low blood sugar, a lack of energy (lethargy), poor feeding, and failure to gain weight and grow. Additional features of this disorder may include poor muscle tone (hypotonia), seizures, developmental delays, and microcephaly. The symptoms of short-chain acyl-CoA dehydrogenase deficiency may be triggered during illnesses such as viral infections. In some cases, signs and symptoms may not appear until adulthood, when some individuals may develop muscle weakness, while other individuals mild symptoms may never be diagnosed.

== Genetics ==
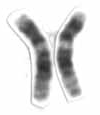
Chromosome 12

SCADD is caused genetically by mutations in the ACADS gene, located on chromosome 12q22-qter. Mutations in the ACADS gene lead to inadequate levels of short-chain acyl-CoA dehydrogenase, which is important for breaking down short-chain fatty acids. Low levels of this enzyme halt short-chain fatty acids from being further broken down and processed in the mitochondria, consequently, these short-chain fatty acids are not converted into energy.

The disorder is inherited via autosomal recessive. This means the defective gene responsible for the disorder is located on an autosome (chromosome 12 is an autosome), and two copies of the defective gene are needed in order to be born with this disorder. The parents of an individual with an autosomal recessive disorder both carry one copy of the defective gene.

== Diagnosis ==
The diagnosis of short-chain acyl-coenzyme A dehydrogenase deficiency is based on the following:

- Newborn screening test
- Genetic testing
- Urine test

=== Differential diagnosis ===
The differential diagnosis for short-chain acyl-coenzyme A dehydrogenase deficiency is: ethylmalonic encephalopathy, mitochondrial respiratory chain defects and multiple acyl-CoA dehydrogenase deficiency.

== Treatment ==
Riboflavin

In terms of treatment for this condition, short-chain acyl-CoA dehydrogenase deficiency, some individuals may not need treatment, while others might follow administration of:

- Riboflavin
- Dextrose
- Anticonvulsants

== Epidemiology ==
This disorder, epidemiologically speaking, is thought to affect approximately 1 in 50,000 newborns according to Jethva, et al. While in the U.S. state of California there seems to be a ratio of 1 in 35,000.
