= Acid lipase disease =

Disorders of fatty acid metabolism

- Specialty: Medical genetics

Acid lipase disease or deficiency is a name used to describe two related disorders of fatty acid metabolism. Acid lipase disease occurs when the enzyme lysosomal acid lipase that is needed to break down certain fats that are normally digested by the body is lacking or missing. This results in the toxic buildup of these fats in the body's cells and tissues. These fatty substances, called lipids, include waxes, oils, and cholesterol.Three rare lipid storage diseases are caused by the deficiency of the enzyme lysosomal acid lipase:

- Lysosomal acid lipase deficiency (LAL-D)
- Wolman disease (early onset lysosomal acid lipase deficiency)
- Cholesteryl ester storage disease (CESD)

== Symptoms and signs ==
In both Wolman disease and Cholesteryl ester storage disease there is a deficiency of lysosomal acid lipase which causes an array of symptoms with in the body. The inability to break down fats in Wolman's disease causes symptoms of:

- Abdominal distention
- Adrenal calcification
- Hepatic failure
- Hepatomegaly
- Nausea and vomiting
- Steatorrhea
- Anemia
- Ascites
- Cachexia
- Jaundice
- Growth delay.

In Cholesteryl ester storage there are alterations in the blood lipoprotein amounts which lead to symptoms such as; hypercholesterolemia, hypertriglyceridemia, and HDL deficiency with abnormal lipid deposition in many organs. The hallmarks of the disease in infants consist of prominent hepatosplenomegaly, diarrhea and vomiting, resulting in malabsorption, growth failure and liver failure. These infants quickly develop liver fibrosis and cirrhosis due to the massive accumulation of cholesteryl esters and triglycerides in the liver.

== Causes ==
Lysosomal acid lipase enzyme deficiency is caused by a mutation in the LIPA gene which provides instructions for the produce this enzyme. When there are malfunctions in this gene the development of Wolman disease and Cholesteryl ester storage disease take place.

== Mechanism ==
The lysosomal acid lipase enzyme is found within the compartments of the lysosomes with in the cell. When the lysosomal acid lipase enzyme is functioning properly, fats such as triglycerides and cholesteryl esters are broken down into their simpler lipid components through hydrolysis. After triglycerides are broken down, the fatty acids are used for energy. Cholesteryl esters are broken down into its cholesterol and fatty acid components, this delivers cholesterol to the cell. These lipids are either used by the body or sent to the liver for removal. In acid lipase disease the lysosomal acid lipase enzyme is either lacking or missing. In both CESD and Wolman's disease there is a mutation with in the LIPA gene, which maps to chromosome 10q23.2, has 10 exons and is approximately 45 kb in length, that encodes for the lysosomal acid lipase enzyme. This mutation causes a loss of function in the gene. This results in the toxic buildup of fats in the body's cells and tissues, which causes an array of symptoms.

== Diagnosis ==
Wolman Disease and Cholesteryl ester storage disease are both diagnosed by observation of previous medical history and symptoms, physical exams, laboratory tests also genetic testing. In laboratory test it is expected that the total serum concentration of cholesterol, low density lipoproteins, and triglycerides will be high and the serum concentration of high density lipoproteins are low for a positive result of acid lipase disease.

The genetic tests done are:

- Single-gene testing
- A multigene panel
- (If needed) More comprehensive genomic testing

Genetic tests are performed on a sample of blood, hair, skin, amniotic fluid (the fluid that surrounds a fetus during pregnancy), or other tissue. For example, a procedure called a buccal smear uses a small brush or cotton swab to collect a sample of cells from the inside surface of the cheek.

== Prevention ==
Prevention methods of inheriting lysosomal acid lipase deficiency would genetic counseling of the parents who are likely to be carriers of the mutated gene before having offspring.

== Treatment ==
An FDA approved treatment for Wolman disease is the medication Kanuma or Sebelipase alfa. This drug works as an enzyme replacement therapy which allows the body to begin breaking down triglycerides and cholesteryl esters into their simpler lipid components once again. Some other methods of treating lysosomal acid lipase deficiency and Cholesteryl ester storage disease include; a low-fat diet, the prescription of statins and other lipid-lowering agents, stem cell transplant, and liver transplants.

== Prognosis ==
Lifespan for individuals with CESD is expected to be longer than individuals with Wolman disease, and available treatments may prolong life into adulthood. However, approximately 50% of individuals with CESD die in the second decade of life due to complications of liver disease or heart disease. Infants with LAL-D typically present in the first weeks of life and die within 6–12 months due to multi-organ failure.

== Research ==
There are many studies taking place to further understand how the lysosomal acid lipase disease works at a cellular and molecular level, which can be applied to the development of new treatments for these diseases. One study called "Role of lysosomal acid lipase in the metabolism of plasma low density lipoprotein. Observations in cultured fibroblasts from a patient with cholesteryl ester storage disease." looks at the ability of human fibroblasts to hydrolyzes the cholesteryl esters of exogenous LDL and thus provides the cell with free cholesterol. Other studies look at the fact that acid lipase disease is often under diagnosed. To combat this, scientists are looking at the molecular mechanisms, differential diagnosis, and identification of the hallmarks of acid lipase disease.
