= ACADVL =

Protein-coding gene in the species Homo sapiens

Identifiers
- Aliases: ACADVL, acyl-CoA dehydrogenase, very long chain, ACAD6, LCACD, VLCAD, acyl-CoA dehydrogenase very long chain
- External IDs: OMIM: 609575; MGI: 895149; GeneCards: ACADVL
Available structures
PDB	Ortholog search: PDBe RCSB
PDB	List of PDB id codes 2UXW, 3B96
Enzyme activity
EC #	BRENDA	ExPASy	KEGG	MetaCyc
1.3.8.8	↗	↗	↗	↗
1.3.8.9	↗	↗	↗	↗

Gene location (Human)
Chr.	Chromosome 17 (human)
Band	17p13.1	Start	7,217,125 bp
Band	17p13.1	End	7,225,266 bp

Gene location (Mouse)
Chr.	Chromosome 11 (mouse)
Band	11 B3|11 42.96 cM	Start	69,901,009 bp
Band	11 B3|11 42.96 cM	End	69,906,237 bp
RNA expression pattern
Bgee	Human / Mouse (ortholog); Top expressed in: right adrenal cortex; apex of heart; left adrenal cortex; anterior pituitary; right lobe of liver; right hemisphere of cerebellum; left lobe of thyroid gland; right lobe of thyroid gland; left ventricle; mucosa of transverse colon / Top expressed in: myocardium of ventricle; right ventricle; cardiac muscles; extraocular muscle; digastric muscle; soleus muscle; intercostal muscle; sternocleidomastoid muscle; masseter muscle; thoracic diaphragm; More reference expression data
BioGPS	n/a
Gene ontology
Molecular function	oxidoreductase activity, acting on the CH-CH group of donors; acyl-CoA dehydrogenase activity; oxidoreductase activity; flavin adenine dinucleotide binding; long-chain-acyl-CoA dehydrogenase activity; fatty-acyl-CoA binding; very-long-chain-acyl-CoA dehydrogenase activity
Cellular component	membrane; mitochondrial matrix; nucleolus; mitochondrion; mitochondrial inner membrane; mitochondrial nucleoid; nucleus; cytosol; mitochondrial membranes
Biological process	epithelial cell differentiation; negative regulation of fatty acid biosynthetic process; lipid metabolism; negative regulation of fatty acid oxidation; energy derivation by oxidation of organic compounds; fatty acid metabolic process; regulation of cholesterol metabolic process; IRE1-mediated unfolded protein response; fatty acid beta-oxidation; temperature homeostasis; fatty acid catabolic process; response to cold; fatty acid beta-oxidation using acyl-CoA dehydrogenase
Sources:Amigo / QuickGO
Orthologs
Databases	NCBI: entry; OMA: entry
Species	Human	Mouse
Entrez	37	11370
Ensembl	ENSG00000072778	ENSMUSG00000018574
UniProt	P49748	P50544
RefSeq (mRNA)	NM_000018; NM_001033859; NM_001270447; NM_001270448	NM_017366
RefSeq (protein)	NP_000009; NP_001029031; NP_001257376; NP_001257377	NP_059062
Location (UCSC)	Chr 17: 7.22 – 7.23 Mb	Chr 11: 69.9 – 69.91 Mb
PubMed search
- Wikidata
View/Edit Human	View/Edit Mouse

Very long-chain specific acyl-CoA dehydrogenase, mitochondrial (VLCAD) is an enzyme that in humans is encoded by the ACADVL gene.

Mutations in the ACADVL are associated with very long-chain acyl-coenzyme A dehydrogenase deficiency. The protein encoded by this gene is targeted to the inner mitochondrial membrane, where it catalyzes the first step of the mitochondrial fatty acid beta-oxidation pathway. This acyl-Coenzyme A dehydrogenase is specific to long-chain and very-long-chain fatty acids. A deficiency in this gene product reduces myocardial fatty acid beta-oxidation and is associated with cardiomyopathy. Alternative splicing results in multiple transcript variants encoding different isoforms.

== Structure ==
The ACADVL gene contains 20 exons, and is about 5.4 kb long. VLCAD has interesting gene structure in humans, in that is located in a head-to-head structure with the DLG4 gene on Chromosome 17, and that the transcribed regions of these genes overlap. It has been shown that treatment with DEHP results in upregulation by the minimal promoter. While DLG4 and VLCAD share common regulatory elements, they each have separate and distinct tissue-specific elements that confer their function. In mice, these two genes are in a head-to-head orientation, but they do not overlap.

== Function ==
The VLCAD enzyme catalyzes most of fatty acid beta-oxidation by forming a C2-C3 trans-double bond in the fatty acid. VLCAD is specific to very long-chain fatty acids, typically C16-acyl-CoA and longer. In mice that have VLCAD deficiency, there is little to no protein hyperacetylation in the liver; this implies that the VLCAD protein is also necessary for protein acetylation in this biological system.

== Clinical significance ==
ACADVL is linked with very long-chain acyl-coenzyme A dehydrogenase deficiency (VLCADD), which has many symptoms, and typically presents as one of three phenotypes. The first is severe, with an early childhood onset and high mortality rate; the most common symptom is this form is cardiomyopathy. The second is a late onset childhood form, with milder symptoms that present most commonly as hypoketotic hypoglycemia. The final form presents in adulthood, and presents as isolated skeletal muscle involvement, rhabdomyolysis, and myoglobinuria, which is triggered by exercise or fasting. The disease is typically diagnosed by first performing tandem mass spectrometry on a blood sample of the patient during a period of stress, and then performing molecular genetic testing for the presence of the ACADVL gene. The deficiency is treated systematically, but certain conditions such as fasting, myocardial irritation, dehydration, and high fat diets are avoided in an attempt to prevent secondary complications.

== Interactions ==
ACADVL has been shown to have 75 binary protein-protein interactions including 73 co-complex interactions. ACADVL appears to interact with RPSA and GPHN.

== See also ==
- Acyl CoA dehydrogenase
