= Reye syndrome =

Rapidly worsening brain disease

- Other names: Reye's syndrome
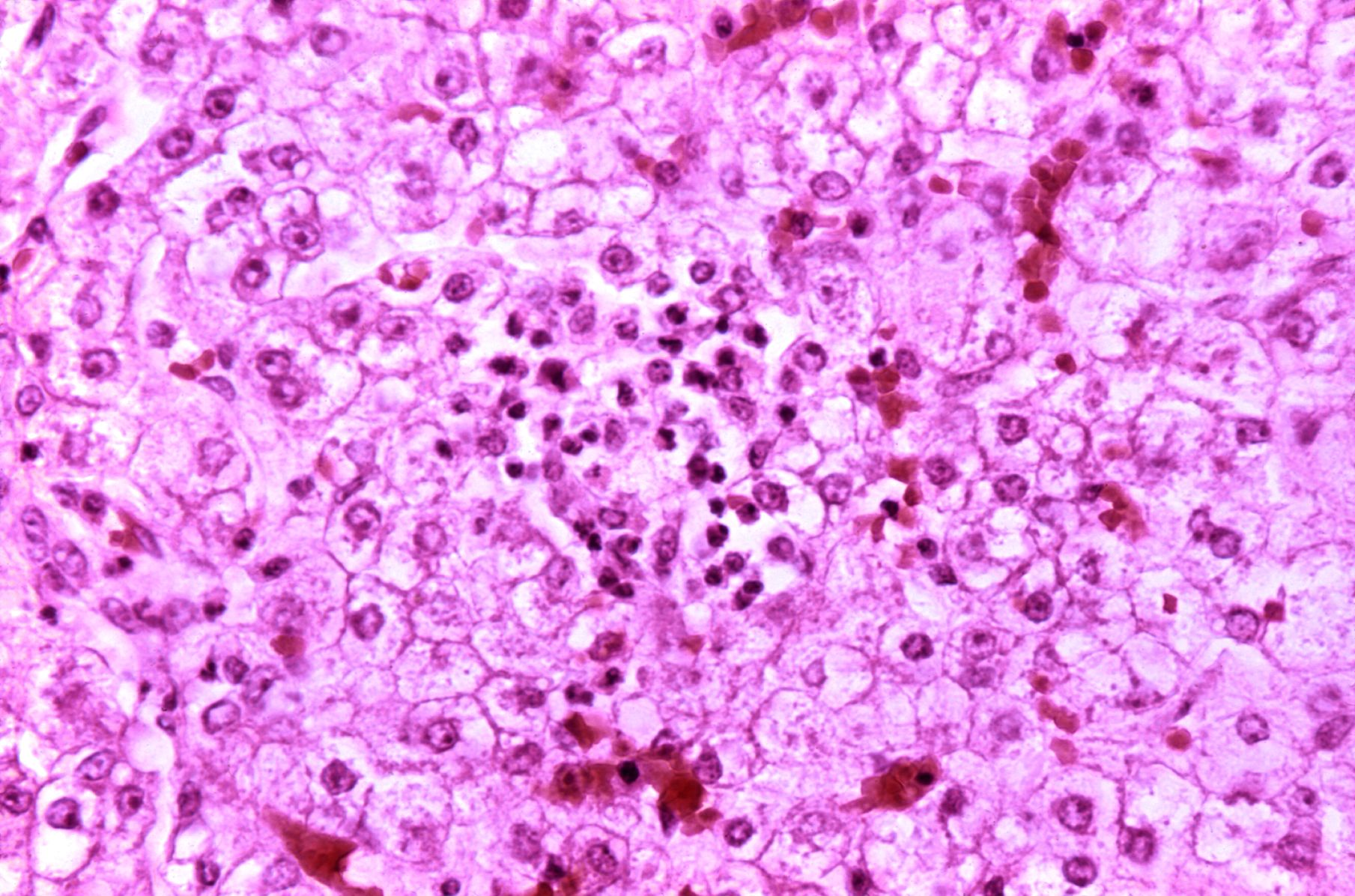
- Appearance of a liver from a child who died of Reye syndrome as seen with a microscope. Hepatocytes are pale-staining due to intracellular fat droplets.
- Pronunciation: /raɪ ˈsɪndroʊm/ rye SIN-drohm
- Specialty: Pediatrics
- Symptoms: Vomiting, personality changes, confusion, seizures, loss of consciousness
- Complications: Persistent vegetative state, coma
- Causes: Unknown
- Risk factors: Aspirin use in children, viral infection
- Treatment: Supportive care
- Medication: Mannitol
- Frequency: Less than one in a million children a year
- Deaths: ~30% chance of death

Reye syndrome or Reye's syndrome is a rapidly worsening brain disease. Signs and symptoms of Reye syndrome may include vomiting, personality changes, confusion, seizures, and loss of consciousness. While liver toxicity typically occurs in the syndrome, jaundice usually does not. Death occurs in 20–40% of those affected with Reye syndrome, and about a third of those who survive are left with a significant degree of brain damage.

The cause of Reye syndrome is unknown. It usually begins shortly after recovery from a viral infection, such as influenza or chickenpox. About 90% of cases in children are associated with aspirin (acetylsalicylic acid) use. Inborn errors of metabolism are also a risk factor. The syndrome is associated with changes on blood tests such as a high blood ammonia level, low blood sugar level, and prolonged prothrombin time. Often, the liver is enlarged in those who have the syndrome.

Prevention is typically achieved by avoiding aspirin in children. When aspirin was withdrawn for use in children in the US and UK in the 1980s, a decrease of more than 90% in rates of Reye syndrome was observed. Early diagnosis of the syndrome improves outcomes. Treatment is supportive; mannitol may be used to help with the brain swelling.

The first detailed description of Reye syndrome was in 1963 by Australian pathologist Douglas Reye. The syndrome most commonly affects children, with less than one in a million (0.0001%) children affected per year. The general recommendation to use aspirin in children was withdrawn because of Reye syndrome, with use only recommended in Kawasaki disease.

== Signs and symptoms ==
Reye syndrome progresses through five stages:

- Stage I
  - Vasoconstrictive rash on palms of hands and feet
  - Persistent, heavy vomiting that is not relieved by not eating
  - Generalized lethargy
  - Confusion
  - Nightmares (possible symptom)
  - No fever usually present
  - Headaches
- Stage II
  - Deep lethargy
  - Delirium
  - Confusion
  - Combative behavior
  - Stupor
  - Hyperventilation
  - Fatty liver (found on biopsy)
  - Hyperactive reflexes
  - Extreme Cluster Headaches
- Stage III
  - Continuation of Stage I and II symptoms
  - Possible coma
  - Possible cerebral edema
  - Possible seizures
  - Rarely, respiratory arrest
  - Decorticate posturing
- Stage IV
  - Seizures
  - Decerebrate posturing
  - Deepening coma
  - Dilated pupils with minimal response to light
  - Loss of oculocephalic reflexes
  - Minimal but still present liver dysfunction
- Stage V
  - Very rapid onset following stage IV
  - Areflexia
  - Deep coma
  - Dilated, nonreactive pupils
  - Isoelectric EEG
  - Respiratory arrest
  - Seizures
  - Multiple organ failure
  - Flaccidity
  - Hyperammonemia (above 300 mg/dL)
  - Death

== Causes ==
The cause of Reye syndrome is unknown. It usually begins shortly after recovery from a viral infection, such as influenza or chickenpox. About 90% of cases in children are associated with aspirin (salicylate) use. Inborn errors of metabolism are also a risk factor.

The association with aspirin has been shown through epidemiological studies. The diagnosis of Reye syndrome greatly decreased in the 1980s, when genetic testing for inborn errors of metabolism was becoming available in industrialized countries. A retrospective study of 49 survivors of cases diagnosed as Reye syndrome showed that the majority of the surviving patients had various metabolic disorders, particularly a fatty-acid oxidation disorder medium-chain acyl-CoA dehydrogenase deficiency.

=== Aspirin ===
There is an association between taking aspirin for viral illnesses and the development of Reye syndrome, but no animal model of Reye syndrome has been developed in which aspirin causes the condition.

The serious symptoms of Reye syndrome appear to result from damage to cellular mitochondria, at least in the liver. There are several ways that aspirin could cause or exacerbate mitochondrial damage. A potential increased risk of developing Reye syndrome is one of the main reasons that aspirin has not been recommended for use in children and teenagers, the age group for which the risk of lasting serious effects is highest.

In some countries, oral mouthcare product Bonjela (not the form specifically designed for teething) has labeling cautioning against its use in children, given its salicylate content. There have been no cases of Reye syndrome following its use, and the measure is a precaution. Other medications containing salicylates are often similarly labeled as a precaution for usage in children to avoid complications.

The Centers for Disease Control and Prevention (CDC), the U.S. Surgeon General, the American Academy of Pediatrics (AAP) and the Food and Drug Administration (FDA) recommend that aspirin and combination products containing aspirin not be given to children and teenagers under 19 years of age during episodes of fever-causing illnesses. Hence, in the United States, it is advised that the opinion of a doctor or pharmacist should be obtained before anyone under 19 years of age is given any medication containing aspirin (also known on some medicine labels as acetylsalicylate, salicylate, acetylsalicylic acid, ASA, or salicylic acid).

As of 2007, advice in the United Kingdom by the Committee on Safety of Medicines is that aspirin should not be given to those under the age of 16 years, unless specifically indicated in Kawasaki disease or in the prevention of blood clot formation.

== Diagnosis ==
=== Differential diagnosis ===
Causes for similar symptoms include

- Various inborn metabolic disorders
- Viral encephalitis
- Drug overdose or poisoning
- Head trauma
- Liver failure due to other causes
- Meningitis
- Kidney failure
- Shaken baby syndrome

== Treatment ==
Treatment is supportive. Mannitol may be used to help with the brain swelling.

== Prognosis ==
Documented cases of Reye syndrome in adults are rare. The recovery of adults with the syndrome is generally complete, with liver and brain function returning to normal within two weeks of onset.

In children, mild to moderate to severe permanent brain damage is possible, especially in infants. Over thirty percent of the cases reported in the United States from 1981 through 1997 resulted in fatality.

== Epidemiology ==
Reye syndrome occurs almost exclusively in children. While a few adult cases have been reported over the years, these cases do not typically show permanent neural or liver damage. Unlike in the United Kingdom, the surveillance for Reye syndrome in the United States is focused on people under 18 years of age.

In 1980, after the CDC began cautioning physicians and parents about the association between Reye syndrome and the use of salicylates in children with chickenpox or virus-like illnesses, the incidence of Reye syndrome in the United States began to decline, prior to the FDA's issue of warning labels on aspirin in 1986. In the United States between 1980 and 1997, the number of reported cases of Reye syndrome decreased from 555 cases in 1980 to about two cases per year since 1994. During this period, 93% of reported cases for which racial data were available occurred in whites, and the median age was six years. In 93% of cases, a viral illness had occurred in the preceding three-week period. For the period 1991–1994, the annual rate of hospitalization due to Reye syndrome in the United States was estimated to be between < 0.3 and 1 per million population less than 18 years of age.

During the 1980s, a case-control study carried out in the United Kingdom also demonstrated an association between Reye syndrome and aspirin exposure. In June 1986, the United Kingdom Committee on Safety of Medicines issued warnings against the use of aspirin in children under 12 years of age, and warning labels on aspirin-containing medications were introduced. United Kingdom surveillance for Reye syndrome documented a decline in the incidence of the illness after 1986. The reported incidence rate of Reye syndrome decreased from a high of 0.63 per 100,000 population less than 12 years of age in 1983–1984 to 0.11 in 1990–1991.

From November 1995 to November 1996 in France, a national survey of pediatric departments for children under 15 years of age with unexplained encephalopathy and a threefold (or greater) increase in serum aminotransferase and/or ammonia led to the identification of nine definite cases of Reye syndrome (0.79 cases per million children). Eight of the nine children with Reye syndrome were found to have been exposed to aspirin. In part because of this survey result, the French Medicines Agency reinforced the international attention to the relationship between aspirin and Reye syndrome by issuing its own public and professional warnings about this relationship.

== History ==
The syndrome is named after Douglas Reye, who, along with fellow physicians Graeme Morgan and Jim Baral, published the first study of the syndrome in 1963 in The Lancet. In retrospect, the occurrence of the syndrome may have first been reported in 1929. Also in 1964, George Johnson and colleagues published an investigation of an outbreak of influenza B that described 16 children who developed neurological problems, four of whom had a profile remarkably similar to Reye syndrome. Some investigators refer to this disorder as Reye-Johnson syndrome, although it is more commonly called Reye syndrome. In 1979, Karen Starko and colleagues conducted a case-control study in Phoenix, Arizona, and found the first statistically significant link between aspirin use and Reye syndrome. Studies in Ohio and Michigan soon confirmed her findings pointing to the use of aspirin during an upper respiratory tract or chickenpox infection as a possible trigger of the syndrome. Beginning in 1980, the CDC cautioned physicians and parents about the association between Reye syndrome and the use of salicylates in children and teenagers with chickenpox or virus-like illnesses. In 1982, the U.S. Surgeon General issued an advisory, and in 1986, the Food and Drug Administration required a Reye syndrome-related warning label for all aspirin-containing medications.
