= 3-Hydroxy-3-methylglutaryl-CoA lyase deficiency =

- Other names: HMGCL deficiency, HMG-CoA lyase deficiency, HMGCLD, hydroxymethylglutaric aciduria.
- Skeletal formula of 3-hydroxy-3-methylglutaryl-coenzyme A
- Specialty: Pediatrics

3-Hydroxy-3-methylglutaryl-CoA lyase deficiency, (HMGCLD) also known as HMGCL deficiency, HMG-CoA lyase deficiency, or hydroxymethylglutaric aciduria, is an uncommon autosomal recessive inborn error in ketone body production and leucine breakdown caused by HMGCL gene mutations. HMGCL, located on chromosome 1p36.11's short arm, codes for HMG-CoA lyase, mitochondrial, which aids in the metabolism of dietary proteins by converting HMG-CoA into acetyl-CoA and acetoacetate.

3-Hydroxy-3-methylglutaryl-CoA lyase deficiency presents in various ways, from severe neonatal symptoms to adult symptoms. Symptoms include frequent vomiting, convulsions, and decreased alertness. Laboratory results include higher plasma/serum transaminase activity, hyperammonemia, acidosis, hypoglycemia, and an increased anion gap.

3-Hydroxy-3-methylglutaryl-CoA lyase deficiency can be identified during newborn screening using tandem mass spectrometry, and is confirmed by enzyme activity testing in lymphocytes, immortalized lymphoblastoid cells, or fibroblasts, as well as HMGCL gene mutation studies.

There are no controlled treatment studies for 3-Hydroxy-3-methylglutaryl-CoA lyase deficiency, making it difficult to determine the need for specific diet or carnitine supplements. The main therapy is avoiding fasting, with L-carnitine supplementation potentially detoxifying and preventing secondary insufficiency.

== Signs and symptoms ==
3-Hydroxy-3-methylglutaryl-CoA lyase deficiency can appear in a variety of ways in terms of clinical presentation, from a severe neonatal onset with potentially fatal consequences to an adult presentation. Clinical signs of 3-Hydroxy-3-methylglutaryl-CoA lyase deficiency appear either early in the neonatal stage or later in the first year of life. Typically, nonspecific symptoms such as frequent vomiting, convulsions, and decreased alertness are displayed by patients. Typical laboratory results include higher plasma/serum transaminase activity, hyperammonemia, acidosis, hypoglycemia, and an increased anion gap.

== Causes ==
3-Hydroxy-3-methylglutaryl-CoA lyase deficiency is the result of HMGCL gene mutations. HMGCL is found on chromosome 1p36.11's short arm and codes for the enzyme 3-hydroxymethyl-3-methylglutaryl-coenzyme A lyase (HMG-CoA lyase). This mitochondrial enzyme contributes to the metabolism of dietary proteins by converting HMG-CoA into acetyl-CoA and acetoacetate, which is the last stage of the breakdown of leucine and fat for energy. As a result, the body is unable to produce ketone bodies, which are necessary for generating energy during fasting. 3-Hydroxy-3-methylglutaryl-CoA lyase deficiency is passed down as an autosomal recessive trait.

== Mechanism ==
The pathophysiology of 3-Hydroxy-3-methylglutaryl-CoA lyase deficiency, like that of many other inborn errors of metabolism, can be explained by the accumulation of potentially harmful metabolites (leucine) and a lack of products (ketone bodies). Hypoglycemia severely impairs counterregulatory compensation because it affects leucine catabolism as well as fat oxidation, which results in secondary metabolic dysfunction. Metabolite levels in the leucine oxidation pathway may be significantly raised, including 3-MGL and 3-HIVA. Additionally, patients with MRI spectroscopy have shown 3-HIVA and 3-HMG, suggesting that these proximal metabolites may play a role in pathogenesis. Depletion of Coenzyme A recycling for other activities can also result from intramitochondrial buildup of acetyl-coA. The relationship between 3-MGC accumulation as a measure of mitochondrial malfunction and leucine oxidation in terms of symptomatology is still unknown.

== Diagnosis ==
Since 3-hydroxy isovaleryl carnitine (C5-OH) is typically elevated in this condition, 3-Hydroxy-3-methylglutaryl-CoA lyase deficiency can be identified during newborn screening by testing it using tandem mass spectrometry methodology. Enzyme activity testing in lymphocytes, immortalized lymphoblastoid cells, or fibroblasts, as well as HMGCL gene mutation studies, may confirm the diagnosis of 3-Hydroxy-3-methylglutaryl-CoA lyase deficiency.

== Treatment ==
As with other uncommon inherited metabolic illnesses, there are no controlled treatment studies for 3-Hydroxy-3-methylglutaryl-CoA lyase deficiency. Consequently, it is impossible to make any judgments about whether a particular diet or carnitine supplements are required. Clinical reports and pathobiochemical considerations suggest that the mainstay of therapy is avoiding fasting. L-carnitine supplementation may have detoxifying properties, prevent intracellular loss of free coenzyme A, and prevent secondary L-carnitine insufficiency.

== Outlook ==
The overall mortality rate of 3-Hydroxy-3-methylglutaryl-CoA lyase deficiency is 16%.

== Epidemiology ==
The incidence of 3-Hydroxy-3-methylglutaryl-CoA lyase deficiency is fewer than 1/100,000 live births.

== History ==
3-Hydroxy-3-methylglutaryl-CoA lyase deficiency was initially reported in 1976, and the gene was discovered and cloned in 1993. The first case in the literature was published in Western Australia in 1976, with usual findings of hypoglycemia and acidosis.

== See also ==
- HMG-CoA
- Mevalonate pathway
