= ACADS =

Protein-coding gene in humans

Identifiers
- Aliases: ACADS, acyl-CoA dehydrogenase, C-2 to C-3 short chain, ACAD3, SCAD, acyl-CoA dehydrogenase short chain
- External IDs: OMIM: 606885; MGI: 87868; GeneCards: ACADS
Available structures
PDB	Ortholog search: PDBe RCSB
PDB	List of PDB id codes 2VIG
Enzyme activity
EC #	BRENDA	ExPASy	KEGG	MetaCyc
1.3.8.1	↗	↗	↗	↗

Gene location (Human)
Chr.	Chromosome 12 (human)
Band	12q24.31	Start	120,725,774 bp
Band	12q24.31	End	120,740,008 bp

Gene location (Mouse)
Chr.	Chromosome 5 (mouse)
Band	5 55.99 cM|5 F	Start	115,248,358 bp
Band	5 55.99 cM|5 F	End	115,257,405 bp
RNA expression pattern
Bgee	Human / Mouse (ortholog); Top expressed in: right lobe of liver; mucosa of transverse colon; apex of heart; gastrocnemius muscle; muscle of thigh; left ventricle; right adrenal gland; right adrenal cortex; left adrenal gland; left adrenal cortex / Top expressed in: white adipose tissue; renal cortex; proximal tubule; heart; human kidney; right kidney; colon; muscle tissue; quadriceps femoris muscle; ileum; More reference expression data
BioGPS	n/a
Gene ontology
Molecular function	oxidoreductase activity; oxidoreductase activity, acting on the CH-CH group of donors; butyryl-CoA dehydrogenase activity; flavin adenine dinucleotide binding; acyl-CoA dehydrogenase activity
Cellular component	nucleus; mitochondrial matrix; mitochondrion; nucleoplasm
Biological process	fatty acid beta-oxidation; lipid metabolism; metabolism; fatty acid metabolic process; fatty acid beta-oxidation using acyl-CoA dehydrogenase; butyrate catabolic process
Sources:Amigo / QuickGO
Orthologs
Databases	NCBI: entry; OMA: entry
Species	Human	Mouse
Entrez	35	11409
Ensembl	ENSG00000122971	ENSMUSG00000029545
UniProt	P16219	Q07417
RefSeq (mRNA)	NM_001302554; NM_000017	NM_007383
RefSeq (protein)	NP_000008; NP_001289483; NP_001289483.1	NP_031409
Location (UCSC)	Chr 12: 120.73 – 120.74 Mb	Chr 5: 115.25 – 115.26 Mb
PubMed search
- Wikidata
View/Edit Human	View/Edit Mouse

Acyl-CoA dehydrogenase, C-2 to C-3 short chain is an enzyme that in humans is encoded by the ACADS gene. This gene encodes a tetrameric mitochondrial flavoprotein, which is a member of the acyl-CoA dehydrogenase family. This enzyme catalyzes the initial step of the mitochondrial fatty acid beta-oxidation pathway. The ACADS gene is associated with short-chain acyl-coenzyme A dehydrogenase deficiency.

== Structure ==
The ACADS gene is approximately 13 kb in length and has 10 exons. The coding sequence of this gene is 1239 bp long. The encoded protein has 412 amino acids, and its size is 44.3 kDa (Human) or 44.9 KDa (Mouse).

== Function ==
The SCAD enzyme catalyzes the first part of fatty acid beta-oxidation by forming a C2-C3 trans-double bond in the fatty acid through dehydrogenation of the flavoenzyme. SCAD is specific to short-chain fatty acids, between C2 and C3-acylCoA. The final result of beta-oxidation is acetyl-CoA. When there are defects that result in SCAD being misfolded, there is an increased production of reactive oxygen species (ROS); the increased ROS forces the mitochondria to undergo fission, and the mitochondrial reticulum takes on a grain-like structure.

== Clinical significance ==
Mutations of the ACADS gene are associated with deficiency of the short-chain acyl-coenzyme A dehydrogenase protein (SCADD); this is also known as butyryl-CoA dehydrogenase deficiency. Many mutations have been identified in specific populations, and large-scale studies have been performed to determine the allelic and genotypic frequency for the defective gene. As short-chain acyl-CoA dehydrogenase is involved in beta-oxidation, a deficiency in this enzyme is marked by an increased amount of fatty acids. This deficiency is characterized by the presence of increased butyrylcarnitine (C4) in blood plasma, and increased ethylmalonic acid (EMA) concentrations in urine. Genotypes of individuals with this deficiency have it as a result of a mutation, variant, or a combination of the two. Among one population with the disease, three subgroups have been identified: one group has a failure to thrive, feeding difficulties, and hypotonia; another group had seizures; finally, one group had hypotonia and no seizures. Other studies showed that the deficiency may be asymptomatic in some individuals under normal conditions, with symptoms presenting under physiological stress conditions such as fasting or illness. The treatment of this deficiency can sometimes be unclear, because it can sometimes be asymptomatic. The treatment for this disease is similar to treatment of other fatty acid oxidation disorders, by trying to restore biochemical and physiologic homeostasis, by promoting anabolism and providing alternative sources of energy. Flavin adenine dinucleotide supplementation has also been identified as a therapy for this deficiency, because it is an essential cofactor for proper function of SCAD. SCAD deficiency is inherited in an autosomal recessive manner. Carrier testing can be performed for at-risk family members, and prenatal testing is also a possibility.

The ACADS gene has also been implicated in delaying the onset of Prader-Willi Syndrome, which is characterized by hypotonia, growth failure, and neurodevelopmental delays in the first years of life, and hyperphagia and obesity much later.

In a genome-wide association study (GWAS), a single-nucleotide polymorphism in ACADS has been associated with a reduced amount of insulin release shown by an oral glucose tolerance test, or OGTT.

== See also ==
- Acyl CoA dehydrogenase
