= Medium-chain acyl-CoA dehydrogenase =

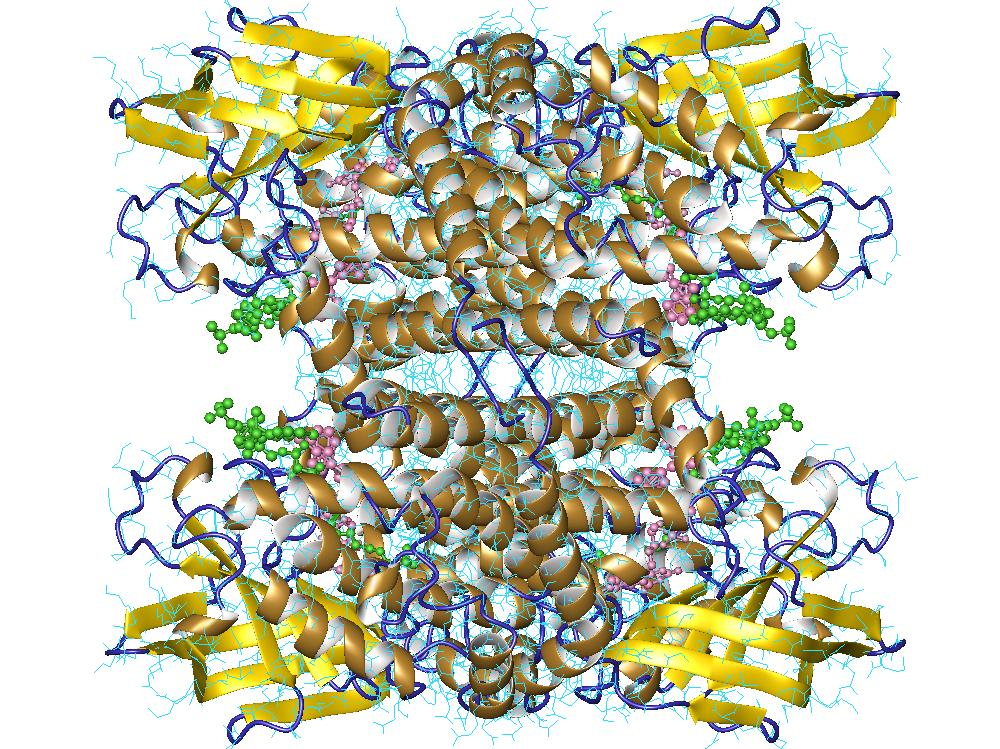
- Medium-chain acyl-CoA dehydrogenase tetramer, Human

Identifiers
- EC no.: 1.3.8.7

Databases
- IntEnz: IntEnz view
- BRENDA: BRENDA entry
- ExPASy: NiceZyme view
- KEGG: KEGG entry
- MetaCyc: metabolic pathway
- PRIAM: profile
- PDB structures: RCSB PDB PDBe PDBsum
Search
- PMC: articles
- PubMed: articles
- NCBI: proteins

Medium-chain acyl-CoA dehydrogenase (EC 1.3.8.7, fatty acyl coenzyme A dehydrogenase (ambiguous), acyl coenzyme A dehydrogenase (ambiguous), acyl dehydrogenase (ambiguous), fatty-acyl-CoA dehydrogenase (ambiguous), acyl CoA dehydrogenase (ambiguous), general acyl CoA dehydrogenase (ambiguous), medium-chain acyl-coenzyme A dehydrogenase, acyl-CoA:(acceptor) 2,3-oxidoreductase (ambiguous), ACADM (gene name).) is an enzyme with systematic name medium-chain acyl-CoA:electron-transfer flavoprotein 2,3-oxidoreductase. This enzyme catalyses the following chemical reaction

a medium-chain acyl-CoA + electron-transfer flavoprotein $\rightleftharpoons$ a medium-chain trans-2,3-dehydroacyl-CoA + reduced electron-transfer flavoprotein

This enzyme contains FAD as prosthetic group and participates in fatty acid metabolism and PPAR signaling pathway.
