= ACADM =

Mammalian protein found in humans

Identifiers
- Aliases: ACADM, acyl-CoA dehydrogenase, C-4 to C-12 straight chain, ACAD1, MCAD, MCADH, acyl-CoA dehydrogenase medium chain
- External IDs: OMIM: 607008; MGI: 87867; GeneCards: ACADM
Available structures
PDB	Ortholog search: PDBe RCSB
PDB	List of PDB id codes 1EGC, 1EGD, 1EGE, 1T9G, 2A1T, 4P13
Enzyme activity
EC #	BRENDA	ExPASy	KEGG	MetaCyc
1.3.8.7	↗	↗	↗	↗

Gene location (Human)
Chr.	Chromosome 1 (human)
Band	1p31.1	Start	75,724,431 bp
Band	1p31.1	End	75,787,575 bp

Gene location (Mouse)
Chr.	Chromosome 3 (mouse)
Band	3 H3|3 78.77 cM	Start	153,627,994 bp
Band	3 H3|3 78.77 cM	End	153,650,269 bp
RNA expression pattern
Bgee	Human / Mouse (ortholog); Top expressed in: jejunal mucosa; Skeletal muscle tissue of rectus abdominis; biceps brachii; right ventricle; Skeletal muscle tissue of biceps brachii; body of tongue; vastus lateralis muscle; renal medulla; kidney tubule; skin of thigh / Top expressed in: right ventricle; myocardium of ventricle; right kidney; brown adipose tissue; human kidney; soleus muscle; extraocular muscle; digastric muscle; cardiac muscles; tunica adventitia of aorta; More reference expression data
BioGPS	n/a
Gene ontology
Molecular function	oxidoreductase activity, acting on the CH-CH group of donors; acyl-CoA dehydrogenase activity; identical protein binding; oxidoreductase activity; medium-chain-acyl-CoA dehydrogenase activity; flavin adenine dinucleotide binding
Cellular component	axon; mitochondrion; extracellular exosome; nucleus; nuclear speck; mitochondrial matrix; mitochondrial membranes
Biological process	medium-chain fatty acid metabolic process; lipid metabolism; fatty acid beta-oxidation using acyl-CoA dehydrogenase; fatty acid metabolic process; metabolism; carnitine biosynthetic process; medium-chain fatty acid catabolic process; carnitine metabolic process, CoA-linked; fatty acid beta-oxidation; regulation of lipid metabolic process
Sources:Amigo / QuickGO
Orthologs
Databases	NCBI: entry; OMA: entry
Species	Human	Mouse
Entrez	34	11364
Ensembl	ENSG00000117054	ENSMUSG00000062908
UniProt	P11310	P45952
RefSeq (mRNA)	NM_000016; NM_001127328; NM_001286042; NM_001286043; NM_001286044	NM_007382
RefSeq (protein)	NP_000007; NP_001120800; NP_001272971; NP_001272972; NP_001272973	NP_031408
Location (UCSC)	Chr 1: 75.72 – 75.79 Mb	Chr 3: 153.63 – 153.65 Mb
PubMed search
- Wikidata
View/Edit Human	View/Edit Mouse

ACADM (acyl-Coenzyme A dehydrogenase, C-4 to C-12 straight chain) is a gene that provides instructions for making an enzyme called acyl-coenzyme A dehydrogenase that is important for breaking down (degrading) a certain group of fats called medium-chain fatty acids.

These fatty acids are found in foods such as milk and certain oils, and they are also stored in the body's fat tissue. Medium-chain fatty acids are also produced when larger fatty acids are degraded.

The acyl-coenzyme A dehydrogenase for medium-chain fatty acids (ACADM) enzyme is essential for converting these particular fatty acids to energy, especially during periods without food (fasting). The ACADM enzyme functions in mitochondria, the energy-producing centers within cells. It is found in the mitochondria of several types of tissues, particularly the liver.

The ACADM gene is located on the short (p) arm of chromosome 1 at position 31, from base pair 75,902,302 to base pair 75,941,203.

== Structure ==
The protein encoded by the ACADM gene is ~47 kDa in size, and composed of 421 amino acids.

== Function ==
The LCAD enzyme catalyzes most of fatty acid beta-oxidation by forming a C2-C3 trans-double bond in the fatty acid. MCAD works on long-chain fatty acids, typically between C4 and C12-acylCoA. Fatty acid oxidation has proven to spare glucose in fasting conditions, and is also required for amino acid metabolism, which is essential for the maintenance of adequate glucose production. Furthermore, MCAD participates in fatty acid metabolism and PPAR signaling pathway.

== Clinical significance ==
Medium-chain acyl-coenzyme A dehydrogenase deficiency can be caused by mutations in the ACADM gene. More than 54 ACADM gene mutations that cause medium-chain acyl-coenzyme A dehydrogenase deficiency have been identified. Many of these mutations switch an amino acid building block in the ACADM enzyme. The most common amino acid substitution replaces lysine with glutamic acid at position 329 in the enzyme's chain of amino acids (also written as Lys329Glu or K329E). This mutation and other amino acid substitutions alter the enzyme's structure, reducing or abolishing its activity. Other mutations delete or duplicate part of the ACADM gene, which leads to an unstable enzyme that cannot function.

With a shortage (deficiency) of functional ACADM enzyme, medium-chain fatty acids cannot be degraded and processed. As a result, these fats are not converted into energy, which can lead to characteristic symptoms of this disorder, such as lack of energy (lethargy) and low blood sugar. Levels of medium-chain fatty acids or partially degraded fatty acids may build up in tissues and can damage the liver and brain, causing more serious complications.
