= DECR2 =

Protein-coding gene in the species Homo sapiens

Identifiers
- Aliases: DECR2, PDCR, SDR17C1, 2,4-dienoyl-CoA reductase 2, peroxisomal, 2,4-dienoyl-CoA reductase 2
- External IDs: OMIM: 615839; MGI: 1347059; GeneCards: DECR2
Available structures
PDB	Ortholog search: PDBe RCSB
PDB	List of PDB id codes 4FC6, 4FC7
Enzyme activity
EC #	BRENDA	ExPASy	KEGG	MetaCyc
1.3.1.124	↗	↗	↗	↗

Gene location (Human)
Chr.	Chromosome 16 (human)
Band	16p13.3	Start	401,858 bp
Band	16p13.3	End	412,487 bp

Gene location (Mouse)
Chr.	Chromosome 17 (mouse)
Band	17 A3.3|17 13.06 cM	Start	26,300,182 bp
Band	17 A3.3|17 13.06 cM	End	26,309,311 bp
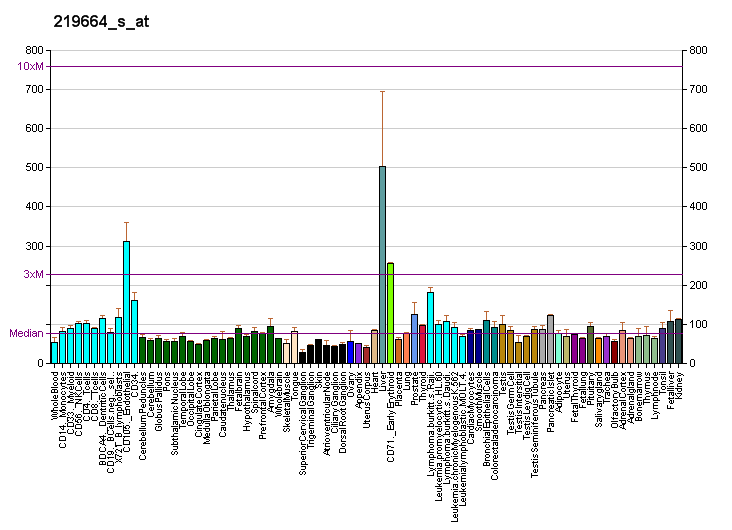
RNA expression pattern
Bgee	Human / Mouse (ortholog); Top expressed in: right lobe of liver; right adrenal cortex; mucosa of transverse colon; left adrenal cortex; duodenum; renal cortex; human kidney; muscle of thigh; apex of heart; body of pancreas / Top expressed in: interventricular septum; left lobe of liver; right kidney; transitional epithelium of urinary bladder; ventromedial nucleus; mammillary body; proximal tubule; seminal vesicula; parotid gland; lateral geniculate nucleus; More reference expression data
BioGPS	More reference expression data
Gene ontology
Molecular function	oxidoreductase activity; signaling receptor binding; 2,4-dienoyl-CoA reductase (NADPH) activity; trans-2-enoyl-CoA reductase (NADPH) activity
Cellular component	peroxisomal membrane; peroxisome; cytosol
Biological process	unsaturated fatty acid biosynthetic process; fatty acid metabolic process; lipid metabolism; fatty acid beta-oxidation using acyl-CoA oxidase; protein targeting to peroxisome
Sources:Amigo / QuickGO
Orthologs
Databases	NCBI: entry; OMA: entry
Species	Human	Mouse
Entrez	26063	26378
Ensembl	ENSG00000242612; ENSG00000274296	ENSMUSG00000036775
UniProt	Q9NUI1	Q9WV68
RefSeq (mRNA)	NM_020664	NM_011933
RefSeq (protein)	NP_065715	NP_036063
Location (UCSC)	Chr 16: 0.4 – 0.41 Mb	Chr 17: 26.3 – 26.31 Mb
PubMed search
- Wikidata
View/Edit Human	View/Edit Mouse

Peroxisomal 2,4-dienoyl-CoA reductase is an enzyme that in humans is encoded by the DECR2 gene.
