= Inborn errors of metabolism =

Class of genetic diseases

Inborn errors of metabolism form a large class of genetic diseases involving congenital disorders of enzyme activities. The majority are due to defects of single genes that code for enzymes that facilitate conversion of various substances (substrates) into others (products). In most of the disorders, problems arise due to accumulation of substances which are toxic or interfere with normal function, or due to the effects of reduced ability to synthesize essential compounds. Inborn errors of metabolism are often referred to as congenital metabolic diseases or inherited metabolic disorders. Another term used to describe these disorders is "enzymopathies". This term was created following the study of biodynamic enzymology, a science based on the study of the enzymes and their products. Finally, inborn errors of metabolism were studied for the first time by British physician Archibald Garrod (1857–1936), in 1908. He is known for work that prefigured the "one gene–one enzyme" hypothesis, based on his studies on the nature and inheritance of alkaptonuria. His seminal text, Inborn Errors of Metabolism, was published in 1923.

== Classification of metabolic diseases ==
Traditionally the inherited metabolic diseases were classified as disorders of carbohydrate metabolism, amino acid metabolism, organic acid metabolism, or lysosomal storage diseases. In recent decades, hundreds of new inherited disorders of metabolism have been discovered and the categories have proliferated. Following are some of the major classes of congenital metabolic diseases, with prominent examples of each class.

- Disorders of carbohydrate metabolism
  - glycogen storage disease
  - G6PD deficiency
- Disorders of amino acid metabolism
  - phenylketonuria
  - tyrosinemia
  - maple syrup urine disease
  - glutaric acidemia type 1
- Urea Cycle Disorder or Urea Cycle Defects
  - Carbamoyl phosphate synthetase I deficiency
  - Citrullinemia type II (citrin deficiency)
- Disorders of organic acid metabolism (organic acidurias)
  - alkaptonuria
  - Combined malonic and methylmalonic aciduria (CMAMMA)
  - 2-hydroxyglutaric acidurias
- Disorders of fatty acid oxidation and mitochondrial metabolism
  - Medium-chain acyl-coenzyme A dehydrogenase deficiency (MCADD)
- Disorders of porphyrin metabolism
  - acute intermittent porphyria
- Disorders of purine or pyrimidine metabolism
  - Lesch–Nyhan syndrome
  - AMPD1 Deficiency (MADD)
- Disorders of steroid metabolism
  - lipoid congenital adrenal hyperplasia
  - congenital adrenal hyperplasia
- Disorders of mitochondrial function
  - Kearns–Sayre syndrome
- Disorders of peroxisomal function
  - Zellweger syndrome
- Lysosomal storage disorders
  - Gaucher's disease
  - Niemann–Pick disease

== Signs and symptoms ==
Because of the enormous number of these diseases and the numerous systems negatively impacted, nearly every "presenting complaint" to a healthcare provider may have a congenital metabolic disease as a possible cause, especially in childhood and adolescence. The following are examples of potential manifestations affecting each of the major organ systems.

- Growth failure, failure to grow, loss of weight
- Ambiguous genitalia, delayed puberty, precocious puberty
- Developmental delay, seizures, dementia, encephalopathy, stroke
- Deafness, blindness, pain agnosia
- Skin rash, abnormal pigmentation, lacking of pigmentation, excessive hair growth, lumps and bumps
- Dental abnormalities
- Immunodeficiency, low platelet count, low red blood cell count, enlarged spleen, enlarged lymph nodes
- Many forms of cancer
- Recurrent vomiting, diarrhea, abdominal pain
- Excessive urination, kidney failure, dehydration, edema
- Low blood pressure, heart failure, enlarged heart, hypertension, myocardial infarction
- Liver enlargement, jaundice, liver failure
- Unusual facial features, congenital malformations
- Excessive breathing (hyperventilation), respiratory failure
- Abnormal behavior, depression, psychosis
- Joint pain, muscle weakness, cramps
- Hypothyroidism, adrenal insufficiency, hypogonadism, diabetes mellitus

== Diagnostic ==
Dozens of congenital metabolic diseases are now detectable by newborn screening tests, especially expanded testing using mass spectrometry. Gas chromatography–mass spectrometry-based technology with an integrated analytics system has now made it possible to test a newborn for over 100 mm genetic metabolic disorders. Because of the multiplicity of conditions, many different diagnostic tests are used for screening. An abnormal result is often followed by a subsequent "definitive test" to confirm the suspected diagnosis.

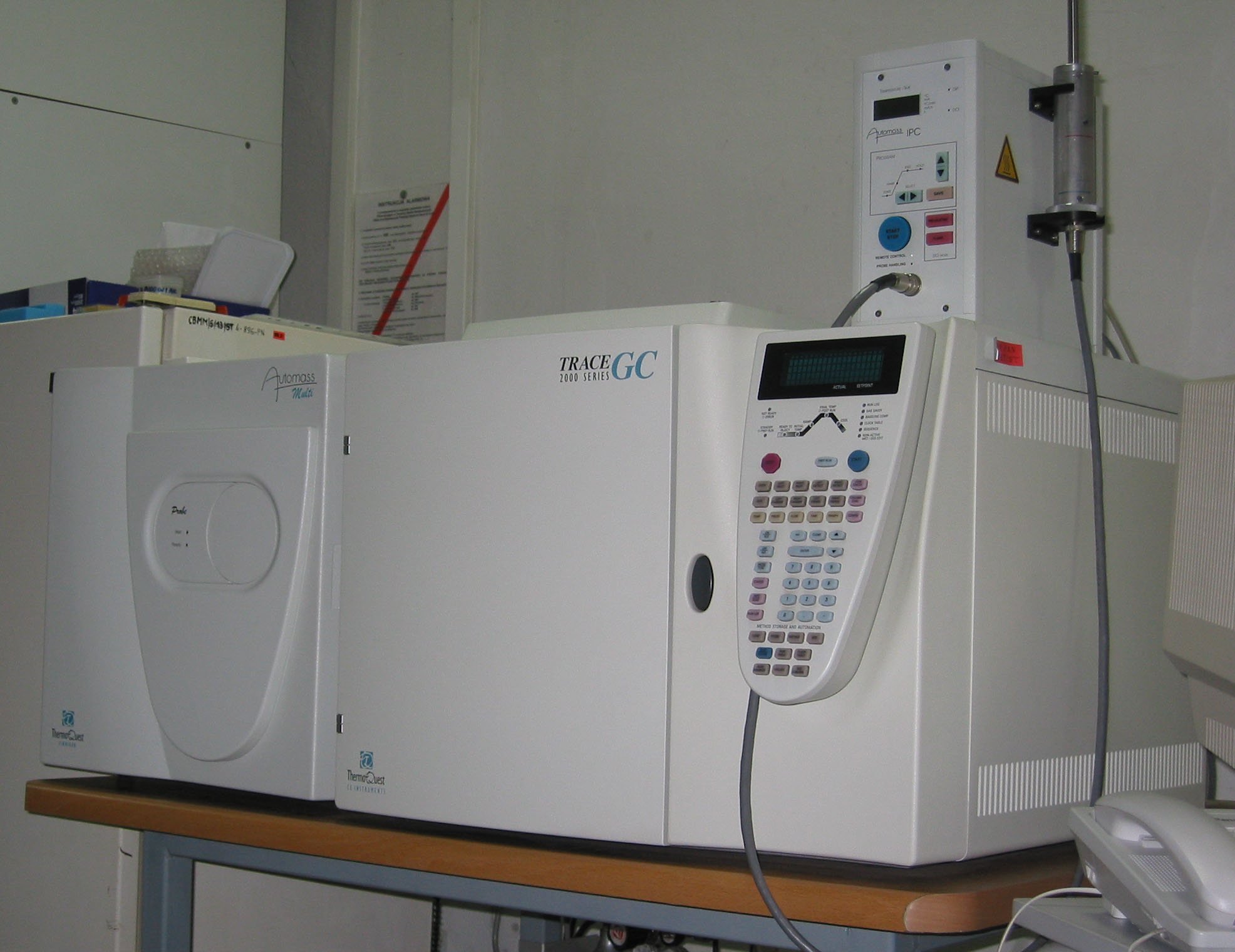
Gas chromatography–mass spectrometry (GCMS) machine

Common screening tests used in the last sixty years:

- Ferric chloride test (detects abnormal metabolites in urine)
- Ninhydrin paper chromatography (detects abnormal amino acid patterns)
- Guthrie test (detects excessive amounts of specific amino acids in blood) The dried blood spot can be used for multianalyte testing using Tandem Mass Spectrometry (MS/MS). This given an indication for a disorder. The same has to be further confirmed by enzyme assays, IEX-Ninhydrin, GC/MS or DNA Testing.
- Quantitative measurement of amino acids in plasma and urine
- IEX-Ninhydrin post-column derivitization liquid ion chromatography (detects abnormal amino acid patterns and quantitative analysis)
- Urine organic acid analysis by gas chromatography–mass spectrometry
- Plasma acylcarnitine analysis by mass spectrometry
- Urine purine and pyrimidine analysis by gas chromatography-mass spectrometry

Specific diagnostic tests (or focused screening for a small set of disorders):

- Tissue biopsy: liver, muscle, brain, bone marrow
- Skin biopsy and fibroblast cultivation for specific enzyme testing
- Specific DNA testing

A 2015 review reported that even with all these diagnostic tests, there are cases when "biochemical testing, gene sequencing, and enzymatic testing can neither confirm nor rule out an IEM, resulting in the need to rely on the patient's clinical course". A 2021 review showed that several neurometabolic disorders converge on common neurochemical mechanisms that interfere with biological mechanisms also considered central in ADHD pathophysiology and treatment. This highlights the importance of close collaboration between health services to avoid clinical overshadowing.

== Treatment ==
In the middle of the 20th century the principal treatment for some of the amino acid disorders was restriction of dietary protein and all other care was simply management of complications. In the past twenty years, new medications, enzyme replacement, gene therapy, and organ transplantation have become available and beneficial for many previously untreatable disorders. Some of the more common or promising therapies are listed:

- Dietary restriction
  - E.g., reduction of dietary protein remains a mainstay of treatment for phenylketonuria and other amino acid disorders
- Dietary supplementation or replacement
  - E.g., oral ingestion of cornstarch several times a day helps prevent people with glycogen storage diseases from becoming seriously hypoglycemic.
- Medications
  - E.g., Nitisinone prevents the formation of toxic metabolites for patients with Tyrosinemia Type I and enables normal growth and development in combination with a low-protein diet
- Vitamins
  - E.g., thiamine supplementation benefits several types of disorders that cause lactic acidosis.
- Intermediary metabolites, compounds, or drugs that facilitate or retard specific metabolic pathways
- Dialysis
- Enzyme replacement E.g. Acid-alpha glucosidase for Pompe disease
- Gene therapy
- Bone marrow or organ transplantation
- Treatment of symptoms and complications
- Prenatal diagnosis

== Epidemiology ==
In a study in British Columbia, the overall incidence of the inborn errors of metabolism were estimated to be 40 per 100,000 live births or 1 in 2,500 births, overall representing more than approximately 15% of single gene disorders in the population. While a Mexican study established an overall incidence of 3.4:1,000 live newborns and a carrier detection of 6.8:1,000 NBS.

Type of inborn error	Incidence	
Disease involving amino acids (e.g. PKU, Tyrosinemia), organic acids, primary lactic acidosis, galactosemia, or a urea cycle disease	24 per 100,000 births	1 in 4,200
Lysosomal storage disease	8 per 100,000 births	1 in 12,500
Peroxisomal disorder	~3 to 4 per 100,000 of births	~1 in 30,000
Respiratory chain-based mitochondrial disease	~3 per 100,000 births	1 in 33,000
Glycogen storage disease	2.3 per 100,000 births	1 in 43,000

== See also ==
- Metab-L, a mailing list for specialists
