= Medium-chain acyl-coenzyme A dehydrogenase deficiency =

Medium-chain acyl-coenzyme A dehydrogenase deficiency (MCAD)
- Other names: Carnitine deficiency secondary to medium-chain acyl-CoA dehydrogenase deficiency, MCAD deficiency or MCADD
- This condition is inherited in an autosomal recessive manner.
- Specialty: Endocrinology

Medium-chain acyl-CoA dehydrogenase deficiency (MCAD deficiency or MCADD) is a disorder of fatty acid oxidation that impairs the body's ability to break down medium-chain fatty acids into acetyl-CoA. The disorder is characterized by hypoglycemia and sudden death without timely intervention, most often brought on by periods of fasting or vomiting.

Prior to expanded newborn screening, MCADD was an underdiagnosed cause of sudden death in infants. Individuals who have been identified prior to the onset of symptoms have an excellent prognosis.

MCADD is most prevalent in individuals of Northern European Caucasian descent, with an incidence of 1:4000 to 1:17,000 depending on the population. Treatment of MCADD is mainly preventive, by avoiding fasting and other situations where the body relies on fatty acid oxidation to supply energy.

== Signs and symptoms ==
MCAD is one of the enzymes responsible for dehydrogenation of fatty acids as they cycle through the beta-oxidation spiral.

MCADD presents in early childhood with hypoketotic hypoglycemia and liver dysfunction, often preceded by extended periods of fasting or an infection with vomiting. Infants who are exclusively breast-fed may present in this manner shortly after birth, due to poor feeding. In some individuals the first manifestation of MCADD may be sudden death following a minor illness. A number of individuals with MCADD may remain completely asymptomatic, provided they never encounter a situation that sufficiently stresses their metabolism. With the advent of expanded newborn screening, some mothers have been identified with MCADD after their infants had positive newborn screens for low carnitine levels.

The enzyme medium-chain acyl-CoA dehydrogenase (MCAD) is responsible for the dehydrogenation step of fatty acids with chain lengths between 6 and 12 carbons as they undergo beta-oxidation in the mitochondria. Fatty acid beta-oxidation provides energy after the body has used up its stores of glucose and glycogen. This oxidation typically occurs during periods of extended fasting or illness when caloric intake is reduced, and energy needs are increased.

== Genetics ==
MCADD is inherited in an autosomal recessive manner, meaning an affected individual must inherit a mutated allele from both of their parents. ACADM is the gene involved, located at 1p31, with 12 exons and coding for a protein of 421 amino acids. There is a common mutation among Northern European Caucasians, replacement of an adenine at position 985 with guanine, which results in a substitution of lysine with glutamic acid at position 304 of the protein. Other mutations have been identified more commonly since newborn screening has expanded the mutation spectrum. The 985A>G common mutation is present in the homozygous state in 80% of Caucasian individuals who presented clinically with MCADD and in 60% of the population identified by screening.

An individual's genotype does not correlate well with their clinical phenotype for MCADD. The clinical presentation of an individual with MCADD depends not only on the presence of the mutations in the ACADM gene, but also on the presence of environmental or physiological stressors that require the body to depend on fatty acid oxidation for energy. Some mutations, identified through newborn screening programs and associated with higher residual enzyme activity have not been seen in individuals with clinical symptoms of MCADD. Despite this, treatment with fasting avoidance remains the norm for all those diagnosed with MCADD.

== Diagnosis ==
Clinically, MCADD or another fatty acid oxidation disorder is suspected in individuals who present with lethargy, seizures, coma and hypoketotic hypoglycemia, particularly if triggered by a minor illness. MCADD can also present with acute liver disease and hepatomegaly, which can lead to a misdiagnosis of Reye syndrome. In some individuals, the only manifestation of MCADD is sudden, unexplained death often preceded by a minor illness that would not usually be fatal.

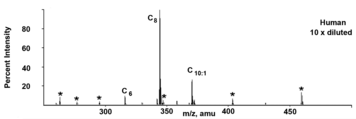
Acylcarnitine profile of an individual with MCADD, showing characteristic elevation of octanoylcarnitine (C8)

In areas with expanded newborn screening using tandem mass spectrometry (MS/MS), MCADD is usually detected shortly after birth, by the analysis of blood spots collected on filter paper. Acylcarnitine profiles with MS/MS will show a very characteristic pattern of elevated hexanoylcarnitine (C6), octanoylcarnitine (C8), decanoylcarnitine (C10) or decenoylcarnitine (C10:1), with C8 being greater than C6 and C10. Secondary carnitine deficiency is sometimes seen with MCADD, and in these cases, acylcarnitine profiles may not be informative. Urine organic acid analysis by gas chromatography-mass spectrometry (GC-MS) will show a pattern of dicarboxylic aciduria with low levels of ketones. Traces of acylglycine species may also be detected. Asymptomatic individuals may have normal biochemical lab results. For these individuals, targeted analysis of acylglycine species by GC-MS, specifically hexanoylglycine and suberylglycine can be diagnostic. After biochemical suspicion of MCADD, molecular genetic analysis of ACADM can be used to confirm the diagnosis. The analysis of MCAD activity in cultured fibroblasts can also be used for diagnosis.

In cases of sudden death where the preceding illness would not usually have been fatal, MCADD is often suspected. The autopsy will often show fatty deposits in the liver. In cases where MCADD is suspected, acylcarnitine analysis of bile and blood can be undertaken postmortem for diagnosis. Where samples are not available, residual blood from newborn screening may be helpful. Biochemical testing of asymptomatic siblings and parents may also be informative. MCADD and other fatty acid oxidation disorders have been recognized in recent years as undiagnosed causes of sudden infant death syndrome.

== Treatment ==
As with most other fatty acid oxidation disorders, individuals with MCADD need to avoid fasting for prolonged periods of time. During illnesses, they require careful management to stave off metabolic decompensation, which can result in death. Supplementation of simple carbohydrates or glucose during illness is key to prevent catabolism. The duration of fasting for individuals with MCADD varies with age, infants typically require frequent feedings or a slow release source of carbohydrates, such as uncooked cornstarch. Illnesses and other stresses can significantly reduce the fasting tolerance of affected individuals.

Individuals with MCADD should have an "emergency letter" that allows medical staff who are unfamiliar with the patient and the condition to administer correct treatment properly in the event of acute decompensation. This letter should outline the steps needed to intervene in a crisis and have contact information for specialists familiar with the individual's care.

Misdiagnosis issues

- The MCADD disorder is commonly mistaken for Reye Syndrome by pediatricians. Reye Syndrome is a severe disorder that may develop in children while they appear to be recovering from viral infections such as chicken pox or flu.
- Most cases of Reye Syndrome are associated with the use of Aspirin during these viral infections.

== Prognosis ==
A 1994 study of the entire population of New South Wales (Australia) found 20 patients. Of these, 5 (25%) had died at or before 30 months of age. Of the survivors, 1 (5%) was severely disabled and the remainder had either suffered mild disability or were making normal progress in school. A 2006 Dutch study followed 155 cases and found that 27 individuals (17%) had died at an early age. Of the survivors, 24 (19%) suffered from some degree of disability, of which most were mild. All the 18 patients diagnosed neonatally were alive at the time of the follow-up.

== Incidence ==
MCADD is most prevalent in individuals of Northern European Caucasian descent. The incidence in Northern Germany is 1:4000, currently the highest in the world. Northern Europe is also the origin of the common mutation in MCADD. For populations without origins in Northern Europe, the incidence is significantly lower, 1:51,000 in Japan and 1:700,000 in Taiwan. The common mutation has not been identified in MCADD cases identified in Asian populations.
