= SERAC1 =

Protein-coding gene in the species Homo sapiens

Identifiers
- Aliases: SERAC1, serine active site containing 1
- External IDs: OMIM: 614725; MGI: 2447813; GeneCards: SERAC1

Gene location (Human)
Chr.	Chromosome 6 (human)
Band	6q25.3	Start	158,109,519 bp
Band	6q25.3	End	158,168,280 bp

Gene location (Mouse)
Chr.	Chromosome 17 (mouse)
Band	17 A1|17 3.67 cM	Start	6,092,471 bp
Band	17 A1|17 3.67 cM	End	6,130,016 bp
RNA expression pattern
Bgee	Human / Mouse (ortholog); Top expressed in: endothelial cell; islet of Langerhans; secondary oocyte; body of pancreas; popliteal artery; tibial arteries; testicle; right adrenal cortex; left adrenal gland; left adrenal cortex / Top expressed in: secondary oocyte; spermatocyte; zygote; spermatid; subiculum; yolk sac; cerebellar cortex; triceps brachii muscle; trigeminal ganglion; cardiac muscle tissue of left ventricle; More reference expression data
BioGPS	n/a
Gene ontology
Molecular function	molecular function
Cellular component	integral component of membrane; membrane; mitochondrion; endoplasmic reticulum; mitochondria associated membranes; extracellular matrix
Biological process	phospholipid biosynthetic process; lipid metabolism; intracellular cholesterol transport; phosphatidylglycerol acyl-chain remodeling; extracellular matrix organization
Sources:Amigo / QuickGO
Orthologs
Databases	NCBI: entry; OMA: entry
Species	Human	Mouse
Entrez	84947	321007
Ensembl	ENSG00000122335	ENSMUSG00000015659
UniProt	Q96JX3	Q3U213
RefSeq (mRNA)	NM_032861	NM_001033127; NM_001111017; NM_177311; NM_001360148
RefSeq (protein)	NP_116250	NP_001104487; NP_796285; NP_001347077
Location (UCSC)	Chr 6: 158.11 – 158.17 Mb	Chr 17: 6.09 – 6.13 Mb
PubMed search
- Wikidata
View/Edit Human	View/Edit Mouse

Serine active site-containing protein 1, or Protein SERAC1 is a protein in humans that is encoded by the SERAC1 gene. The protein encoded by this gene is a phosphatidylglycerol remodeling protein found at the interface of mitochondria and endoplasmic reticula, where it mediates phospholipid exchange. The encoded protein plays a major role in mitochondrial function and intracellular cholesterol trafficking. Defects in this gene are a cause of 3-methylglutaconic aciduria with deafness, encephalopathy, and Leigh-like syndrome (MEGDEL). Two transcript variants, one protein-coding and the other non-protein coding, have been found for this gene.

== Structure ==
The SERAC1 gene is located on the q arm of chromosome 6 at position 25.3 and it spans 58,776 base pairs. The SERAC1 gene produces an 18.7 kDa protein composed of 162 amino acids. The structure of the encoded protein contains a C-terminal serine-lipase/esterase domain containing the consensus lipase motif GxSxG, and an N-terminal signal sequence.

== Function ==
The SERAC1 gene encodes for a protein necessary for phosphatidylglycerol remodeling. phosphatidylglycerol remodeling is a process of altering or remodeling a particular phospholipid called phosphatidylglycerol. Phosphatidylglycerol helps make cardiolipin, an important ingredient that surrounds the Inner mitochondrial membrane. Cardiolipin is responsible for converting energy acquired from food to a cell-usable form and required for proper mitochondrial function. Because of cardiolipin, the remodeling process of phosphatidylglycerol is essential for mitochondrial function and intracellular cholesterol trafficking.

Additionally, SERAC1 is involved in the movement of cholesterol, which are fatty, waxy substances within cells. Cholesterol is a component of cell structure, and produces hormones and digestive acids. The protein may also be involved in the transacylation-acylation reaction to produce phosphatidylglycerol-36:1 and bis(monoacylglycerol)phosphate biosynthetic pathway.

== Clinical Significance ==
Mutations in the SERAC1 gene have been associated to impairment of both mitochondrial function and intracellular cholesterol trafficking. Such mutations have been majorly associated withand Leigh syndrome and 3-methylglutaconic aciduria with deafness, encephalopathy, and Leigh-like syndrome, known as MEGDEL syndrome.

=== MEGDEL syndrome ===
SERAC1 mutations have been heavily associated with MGDEL syndrome. MGDEL syndrome (3-methylglutaconic aciduria with deafness, encephalopathy, and Leigh-like syndrome) is an autosomal recessive disorder characterized by childhood onset of delayed psychomotor development or psychomotor regression, sensorineural deafness, spasticity or dystonia and increased excretion of 3-methylglutaconic acid. Brain imaging shows cerebral and cerebellar atrophy as well as lesions in the basal ganglia reminiscent of Leigh syndrome. Laboratory studies show increased serum lactate and alanine, mitochondrial oxidative phosphorylation defects, abnormal mitochondria, abnormal phosphatidylglycerol and cardiolipin profiles in fibroblasts, and abnormal accumulation of unesterified cholesterol within cells.

The SERAC1 gene mutations that cause this condition reduce the amount of SERAC1 protein that is produced or lead to production of a protein with little or no function. As a result, phosphatidylglycerol remodeling is impaired, which likely alters the composition of cardiolipin. Researchers speculate that the abnormal cardiolipin affects mitochondrial function, reducing cellular energy production and leading to the neurological and hearing problems characteristic of MEGDEL syndrome. It is unclear how SERAC1 gene mutations lead to abnormal release of 3-methylglutaconic acid in the urine.

A c.202C>T mutation in this gene has been found in a patient suffering from 3-methylglutaconic aciduria, and related symptoms. Two patients with Homozygous G>C transversions in the SERAC1 gene have been found to show symptoms of MEGDEL syndrome with deafness, encephalopathy, and Leigh-like syndrome. Another patient with a homozygous 4 base pair deletion (1167delTCAG) showed symptoms of recurrent infections, failure to thrive, mental retardation, spasticity and extrapyramidal symptoms.

=== Leigh syndrome ===
Leigh syndrome is an early-onset progressive neurodegenerative disorder characterized by the presence of focal, bilateral lesions in one or more areas of the central nervous system including the brainstem, thalamus, basal ganglia, cerebellum and spinal cord. Clinical features depend on which areas of the central nervous system are involved and include subacute onset of psychomotor retardation, hypotonia, ataxia, muscle weakness, vision loss, eye movement abnormalities, seizures, and dysphagia.

== Interactions ==
SERAC1 has been shown to have Protein-protein interactions with the following.

- SDF4
- EFGR
- APP
- SLC18A1
- LPAR4
- CBWD1
