= Mitochondrial trifunctional protein =

Inner mitochondrial membrane protein

Schematic demonstrating mitochondrial fatty acid beta-oxidation and effects of long-chain 3-hydroxyacyl-coenzyme A dehydrogenase deficiency, LCHAD deficiency

Mitochondrial trifunctional protein (MTP) is a protein attached to the inner mitochondrial membrane which catalyzes three out of the four steps in beta oxidation. MTP is a hetero-octamer composed of four alpha and four beta subunits:

- HADHA
- HADHB

The three functions are 2-enoyl coenzyme A (CoA) hydratase, long-chain 3-hydroxy acyl-coenzyme A dehydrogenase and long-chain 3-ketoacyl CoA thiolase.

== Association with the electron transport chain ==
Fatty acid beta-oxidation (FAO) and oxidative phosphorylation (OXPHOS) are two major metabolic pathways in the mitochondria. Reducing equivalents from FAO enter OXPHOS at the level of complexes I and III. In 2010, Wang et al. discovered a functional and physical association between MTP and ETC respirasomes. Not only does MTP appear to be bound to Complex I, but it also appears to channel substrates between the two enzymes. This is especially interesting, because up until then it was unknown exactly how MTP was associated with the inner mitochondrial membrane, and this discovery may provide the explanation.

== Hormonal influences ==
Recent research has revealed that MTP can be affected by various hormones, via hormone receptors located in the mitochondria. Chochron et al. (2012) demonstrated that thyroid hormone stimulates mitochondrial metabolism in a pathway mediated by MTP. Zhou et al. (2012) used 2D gel electrophoresis and mass spectrometry to identify MTP as one of the proteins that interacts with ER alpha, a receptor triggered by estrogen.

== Cardiolipin remodeling ==
In 2009, Taylor et al. identified a human mitochondrial protein, monolysocardiolipin acyltransferase (MLCL AT-1), that is identical in amino acid sequence to the 59-kDa C-terminal end of MTP, linking MTP to the remodeling of cardiolipin from monolysocardiolipin. Although MLCL AT-1 and MTP are different proteins, in 2012 the same lab discovered that MTP did indeed have cardiolipin remodeling capabilities. This suggests a possible link between mitochondrial membrane cardiolipin content and beta oxidation.

== Clinical significance ==
Disorders associated with MTP are:

- Mitochondrial trifunctional protein deficiency
- LCHAD deficiency
- Acute fatty liver of pregnancy
