= Acyl-CoA:lysocardiolipin acyltransferase-1 =

Class of enzymes

Identifiers
- Symbol: ALCAT1
- Alt. symbols: LCLAT1, LYCAT
- NCBI gene: 253558
- HGNC: 26756
- OMIM: 614241
- RefSeq: NM_182551.3
- UniProt: Q6UWP7

Other data
- Locus: Chr. 2 p23.1
Search for
- Structures: Swiss-model
- Domains: InterPro

Acyl-CoA:lysocardiolipin acyltransferase-1 (ALCAT1) is a polyglycerophospholipid acyltransferase of the endoplasmic reticulum which is primarily known for catalyzing the acylation of monolysocardiolipin back into cardiolipin, although it does catalyze the acylation of other polyglycerophospholipids.

Overall reaction:

monolysocardiolipin(MLCL) + acyl-CoA = cardiolipin + CoA

ALCAT1 is widely distributed throughout the body, with the highest concentrations being in the heart and liver.

== Mechanism ==
ALCAT1 shares similar mechanism with other acyltransferases that facilitates biosynthesis of esters from acyl-CoA and alcohol. In the first step, the free hydroxyl group on monolysocardiolipin is deprotonated to make a good nucleophilic attacker.

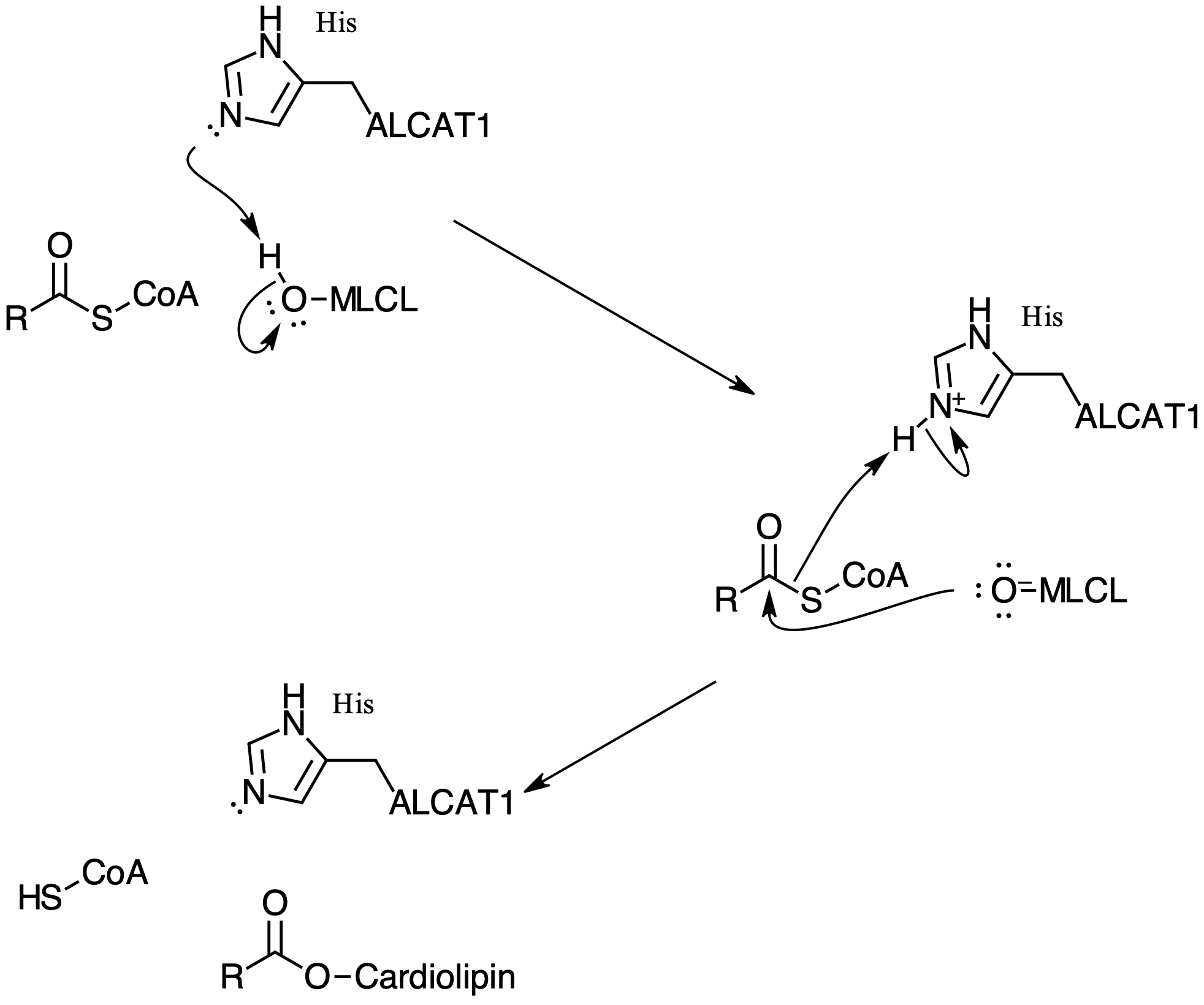
Mechanism of ALCAT1.

== Biological function ==
A cardiolipin molecule achieves optimal biochemical functionality when all four fatty acyls it incorporates are linoleic. This composition of fatty acyl is also known as tetralinoleoyl cardiolipin (TLCL). However, newly synthesized cardiolipin, also known as nascent cardiolipin, does not have such fatty acyl composition. Nascent cardiolipin has to go through a remodeling process, which involves deacylation to monolysocardiolipin (MLCL), then re-acylation back to cardiolipin (ideally TLCL). When first discovered, ALCAT1 was believed to be a member of the group of enzymes that facilitates this important re-acylation of MLCL to TLCL. However, after comparing its activity with other members within this group, including MLCLAT and Tafazzin (TAZ), new theories have been proposed to correlate ALCAT1 activity with oxidative stress and aging.

== Relation to oxidative stress and aging ==
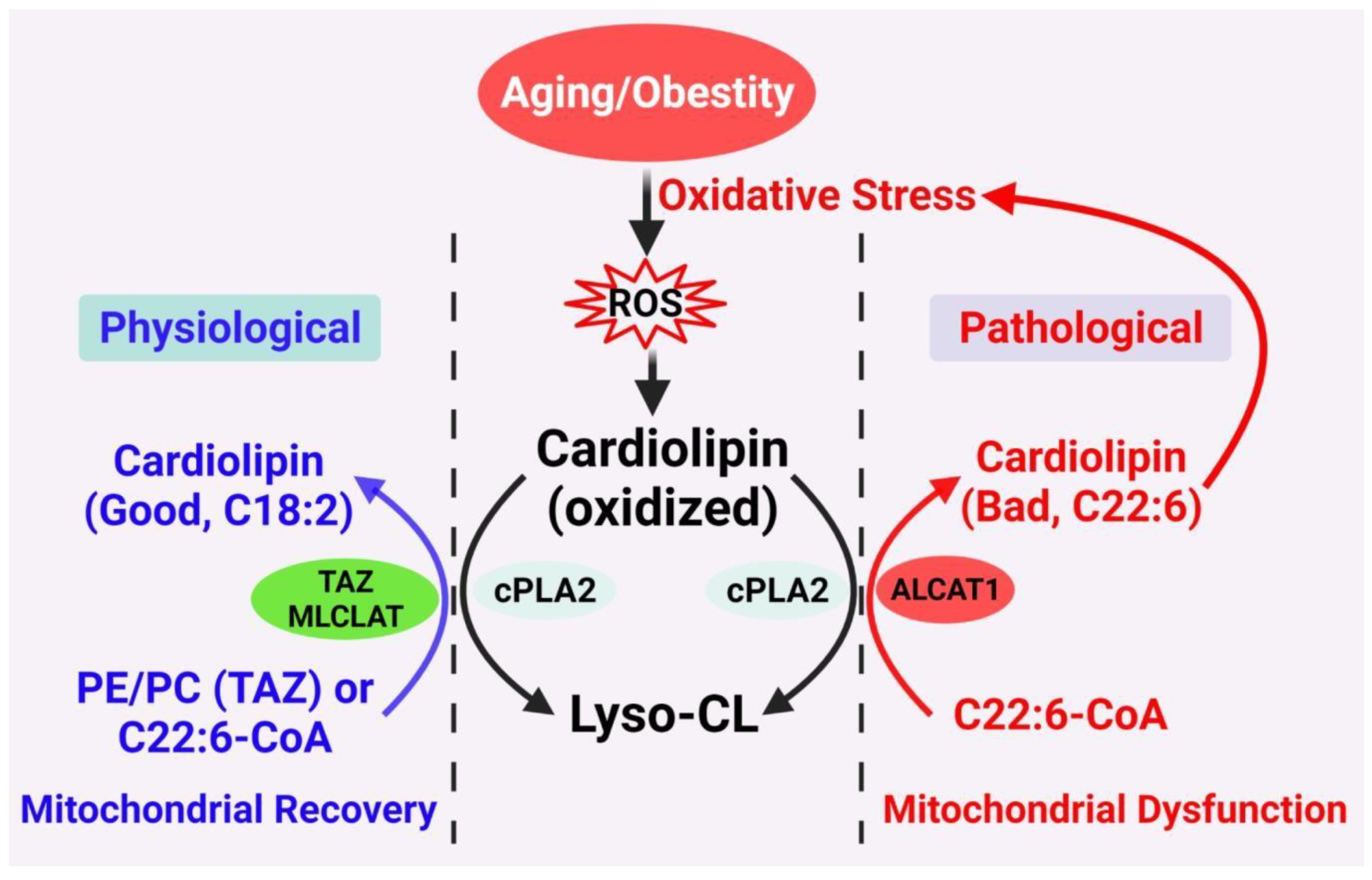
Proposed CL remodeling pathways in aging. Aging causes oxidative stress, leading to the production of ROS. CL oxidation by ROS triggers the remodeling of its fatty acyl chains, which begins with hydrolysis of oxidized CL by cPLA2, followed by re-acylation of MLCL by either Tafazzin (TAZ), MLCLAT, or ALCAT1. Activity of TAZ and MLCLAT leads to mitochondrial recovery. ALCAT1 catalyzes remodeling of CL with MLCL and non-linoleic acyl-CoAs like DHA-CoA (C22:6) as substrates, leading to CL peroxidation by ROS and mitochondrial dysfunction.

While competing against MLCLAT and Tafazzin (TAZ) in re-acylation of MLCL back to cardiolipin, ALCAT1 has much worse selectivity in linoleic acyl. ALCAT1 occasionally remodels cardiolipins with very-long-chain fatty acyls, such as docosahexaenoic (DHA) and arachidonic, leading to cardiolipins with not only non-optimal functionality compared to that of tetralinoleoyl cardiolipin (TLCL), but also vulnerability to oxidation. Subsequent mitochondrial dysfunction leads to more oxidative stress and reactive oxygen species (ROS), and consequently faster depletion of physiological cardiolipin due to oxidation. Moreover, the activity of ALCAT1 is up-regulated by oxidative stress, which closes the loop of a vicious cycle that is implicated in the pathogenesis of various age-related diseases.

In animal studies, knockout of ALCAT1 improved cardiac function and inhibited the injury of the heart and kidney in mice with myocardial infraction. An increase of ALCAT1 level has been observed in skeletal muscles of denervation rats. Deficiency of ALCAT1 gene prevented mitochondrial fragmentation from oxidative stress and increased the thickness of the skeletal muscle fibers. Additionally, inhibition of ALCAT1 prevented SOD1 protein aggregation and attenuated skeletal muscle atrophy in SOD1 transgenic mice.

== Clinical significance ==
Accumulating evidence suggests that over-expression of ALCAT1 is involved in pathological cardiolipin remodeling and mitochondrial bioenergetics. Up-regulated expression of ALCAT1 can increase the fraction of cardiolipins with aberrant acyl compositions including enrichment of cardiolipins with docosahexaenoic acyls, leading to tetralinoleoyl cardiolipins (TLCL) depletion. That renders cardiolipins high sensitivity to oxidative damage by reactive oxygen species (ROS), which has been linked to mitochondrial dysfunction associated with various metabolic, cardiovascular and neurodegenerative diseases, such as obesity, nonalcoholic fatty liver disease, coronary heart disease, and Parkinson's disease. Therefore, ALCAT1 is suggested as a novel therapeutic target for the treatment of these diseases.

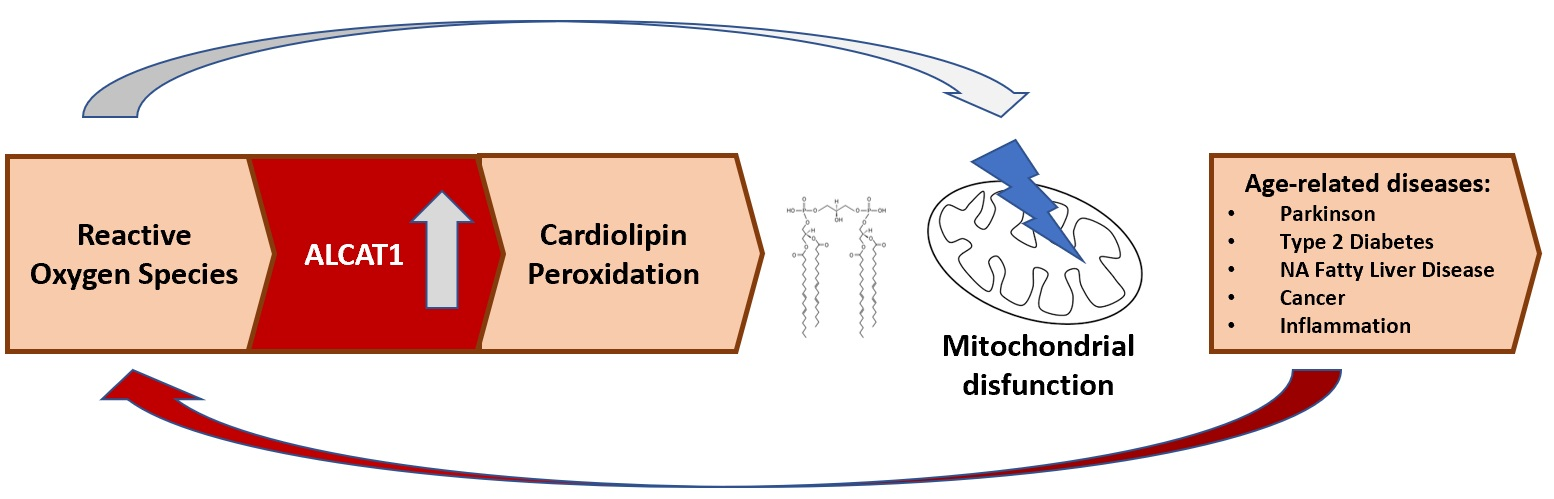
ALCAT1 controls mitochondrial cause for age-related diseases in response to oxidative stress. ALCAT1 expression is up-regulated by ROS from oxidative stress associated with age-related diseases. Cardiolipin remodeling with poly-unsaturated fatty acids by ALCAT1 causes cardiolipin peroxidation, leading to a vicious cycle of ROS production, cardiolipins peroxidation, and mitochondrial dysfunction, which promotes the development of age-related metabolic disease.
