= LCHAD =

HADHA may refer to:

- Long-chain 3-hydroxyacyl-coenzyme A dehydrogenase deficiency
- HADHA, enzyme
