= BTHS =

BTHS may refer to:

- Barth syndrome
- Bartram Trail High School
- Biotechnology High School
- Brooklyn Technical High School
- Burlington Township High School
- Bluetooth headset
- An alternate name for tafazzin
