= AFLP =

AFLP may refer to:

- Amplified fragment length polymorphism, a tool in molecular biology
- Acute fatty liver of pregnancy, a complication of pregnancy
