= C6H8O4 =

The molecular formula C_{6}H_{8}O_{4} may refer to:

- Dimethyl fumarate (DMF)
- Dimethyl maleate
- Meldrum's acid, or 2,2-dimethyl-1,3-dioxane-4,6-dione
- 3-Methylglutaconic acid
- Lactide
