= Tafazzin =

Protein found in humans

TAFAZZIN

Identifiers
- Aliases: TAFAZZIN, BTHS, CMD3A, EFE, EFE2, G4.5, LVNCX, Taz1, tafazzin, TAZ, tafazzin, phospholipid-lysophospholipid transacylase
- External IDs: OMIM: 300394; MGI: 109626; GeneCards: TAFAZZIN

Gene location (Human)
Chr.	X chromosome (human)
Band	Xq28	Start	154,411,524 bp
Band	Xq28	End	154,421,726 bp

Gene location (Mouse)
Chr.	X chromosome (mouse)
Band	X A7.3|X 37.95 cM	Start	73,325,518 bp
Band	X A7.3|X 37.95 cM	End	73,333,757 bp
RNA expression pattern
Bgee	Human / Mouse (ortholog); Top expressed in: apex of heart; granulocyte; right hemisphere of cerebellum; right auricle of heart; right lobe of thyroid gland; spleen; mucosa of transverse colon; left lobe of thyroid gland; tibial nerve; canal of the cervix / Top expressed in: neural layer of retina; muscle of thigh; granulocyte; submandibular gland; saccule; lip; skeletal muscle tissue; parotid gland; right kidney; lobe of prostate; More reference expression data
BioGPS	n/a
Gene ontology
Molecular function	acyltransferase activity; 1-acylglycerophosphocholine O-acyltransferase activity; 1-acylglycerol-3-phosphate O-acyltransferase activity; O-acyltransferase activity
Cellular component	cytoplasm; integral component of membrane; cytosol; mitochondrial membranes; membrane; mitochondrion; mitochondrial inner membrane; intrinsic component of membrane; nucleus
Biological process	muscle contraction; cardiac muscle contraction; mitochondrial ATP synthesis coupled electron transport; cardiac muscle tissue development; cristae formation; mitochondrial respiratory chain complex I assembly; development of the heart; cardiolipin biosynthetic process; metabolism; cardiolipin acyl-chain remodeling; skeletal muscle tissue development; phospholipid metabolic process; positive regulation of cardiolipin metabolic process; positive regulation of ATP biosynthetic process; hemopoiesis; inner mitochondrial membrane organization; regulation of gene expression
Sources:Amigo / QuickGO
Orthologs
Databases	NCBI: entry; OMA: entry
Species	Human	Mouse
Entrez	6901	66826
Ensembl	ENSG00000102125	ENSMUSG00000009995
UniProt	Q16635	Q91WF0
RefSeq (mRNA)	NM_000116; NM_001303465; NM_181311; NM_181312; NM_181313 NM_181314	NM_001173547; NM_001242615; NM_001242616; NM_001290738; NM_181516
RefSeq (protein)	NP_000107; NP_001290394; NP_851828; NP_851829; NP_851830	NP_001167018; NP_001229544; NP_001229545; NP_001277667; NP_852657
Location (UCSC)	Chr X: 154.41 – 154.42 Mb	Chr X: 73.33 – 73.33 Mb
PubMed search
- Wikidata
View/Edit Human	View/Edit Mouse

Tafazzin

Identifiers
- Symbol: TAZ
- InterPro: IPR000872
- Membranome: 459
Available protein structures:
- PDB: IPR000872
- AlphaFold: IPR000872

Tafazzin is a protein that in humans is encoded by the TAFAZZIN gene. Tafazzin is highly expressed in cardiac and skeletal muscle, and functions as a phospholipid-lysophospholipid transacylase (it belongs to phospholipid:diacylglycerol acyltransferases). It catalyzes remodeling of immature cardiolipin to its mature composition containing a predominance of tetralinoleoyl moieties. Several different isoforms of the tafazzin protein are produced from the TAFAZZIN gene. A long form and a short form of each of these isoforms is produced; the short form lacks a hydrophobic leader sequence and may exist as a cytoplasmic protein rather than being membrane-bound. Other alternatively spliced transcripts have been described but the full-length nature of all these transcripts is not known. Most isoforms are found in all tissues, but some are found only in certain types of cells. Mutations in the TAFAZZIN gene have been associated with mitochondrial deficiency, Barth syndrome, dilated cardiomyopathy (DCM), hypertrophic DCM, endocardial fibroelastosis, left ventricular noncompaction (LVNC), breast cancer, papillary thyroid carcinoma, non-small cell lung cancer, glioma, gastric cancer, thyroid neoplasms, and rectal cancer.

The TAZ gene was frequently confused with a protein called TAZ (transcriptional coactivator with PDZ-binding motif, a 50 kDa protein). which is a part of the Hippo pathway and entirely unrelated to the gene of interest. The Hippo pathway TAZ protein has an official gene symbol of WWTR1.

== History ==
Tafazzin was discovered in 1996 by Italian scientists Silvia Bione et al., after long and intensive work. Owing to the complex procedure required for the identification of tafazzin, the protein was named after Tafazzi, a comedic character who enthusiastically beats his groin with a plastic bottle, and whose masochistic traits resonated with the discoverers of the protein.

== Structure ==
The TAFAZZIN gene is located on the q arm of chromosome X at position 28 and it spans 10,208 base pairs. The TAFAZZIN gene produces a 21.3 kDa protein composed of 184 amino acids. The structure of the encoded protein has been found to differ at their N terminus and the central region, which are two functionally notable regions. A 30 residue hydrophobic stretch at the N terminus may function as a membrane anchor, which does not exist in the shortest forms of tafazzins. The second region is a variable exposed loop located between amino acids 124 and 195 in the central region. This hydrophilic region is known to interact with other proteins. TAZ has no known resemblance to other proteins. The half-life of tafazzin is just 3–6 hours, considerably shorter than most mitochondrial proteins, which may explain research difficulties in studying its structure.

The putative phospholipid-binding site, which is the active site of Tafazzin, is a 57 amino acid cleft with two open ends and positively charged residues. In addition, tafazzin localizes to the membrane leaflets facing the intermembrane space (IMS), which is crucial for remodeling. Tafazzin differs from phospholipases in that it contains a conserved histidine residue, His-77, as part of the conserved HX4D motif seen in acyltransferases. This motif is responsible for facilitating the Asp-His dyad mechanism seen in many serine proteases. Many unique forms of tafazzin have been identified, with lengths from 129 to 292 amino acids. Tafazzin has at least four different isoforms. It has a molecular weight around 35 kDa but may also appear in lower molecular weights due to species differences in isoform expression. Seven functional classes of TAFAZZIN mutations have been classified based on the pathogenic loss-of-function mechanisms of each mutation.

The TAFAZZIN gene contains two peptides independent of its active site for directing the protein to the mitochondria, forming residues 84–95 in exon 3 and residues 185–200 in exon 7/8 targets. Tafazzin localizes with peripheral association to membrane leaflets between the inner mitochondrial membrane (IMM) and outer mitochondrial membrane (OMM), facing the intermembrane space (IMS). Tafazzin's characteristic interfacial anchoring is achieved by its hydrophobic sequence from residues 215–232. Finally, the translocase of the outer membrane (TOM) and the translocase of the inner membrane (TIM) mediates tafazzin's movement and insertion into the OMM and anchoring to IMM.

== Function ==
The TAFAZZIN gene provides instructions for producing a protein called tafazzin, which is localized to mitochondria, the energy-producing centers of cells. Tafazzin transacylase activity is responsible for cardiolipin remodeling, critical to maintaining mitochondrial inner membrane structure and function. It also has unique acyl specificity and membrane curvature sensing capabilities.

=== Transacylase (remodeling) ===
After its synthesis, cardiolipin cannot exert its proper functions until it is actively remodeled. Tafazzin, an acyl-specific transferase, catalyzes the acyl transfer reaction between phospholipids and lysophospholipids in a CoA-independent manner. The remodeling process of cardiolipin involves reaching a final acyl composition that is primarily linoleoyl residues. TAZ interacts with an immature cardiolipin by adding the fatty acid linoleic acid, which catalyzes the remodeling of the cardiolipin. The remodeling is achieved by transacylation or the deacylation-reacylation cycle. The deacylation-reacylation cycle, also known as the Lands cycle, begins with deacylation mediated by phospholipase Cld1 to form monolysocardiolipin (MLCL). MLCL is reacylated by tafazzin in a single-step reaction which transfers a linoleic acid group from phosphatidylcholine (PC), completing the CL deacylation-reacylation cycle. In contrast, transacylation involves the transfer of a linoleic acid group from phosphatidylcholine (PC) to MLCL. Such enzymatic activity forms lyso-PC and CL, and enriches the specific acyl chain of cardiolipin. The process has been shown to be specific for linoleoyl-containing PC. Such remodeling processes converts cardiolipin into a mature composition that contains a predominance of tetralinoleoyl moieties. CL remodeling in mammals requires additional enzymes, such as monolysocardiolipin acyltransferase (MLCLAT), acyl-CoA:lysocardiolipin acyltransferase (ALCAT), and phospholipase. The process enables the proper function of cardiolipin.

=== Acyl specificity and sensing curvature ===
Tafazzin in CL remodeling has been shown to have a clear preference for linoleoyl-containing PC in forming mature CL. This specificity leads a mature composition of CL that contains a predominance of tetralinoleoyl moieties, which leads to the enrichment of tetralinoleoyl-cardiolipin (CL4). The preference for lineoyl groups has been reported to be ten times greater than that of oleoyl groups and twenty times greater than that of arachidonoyl groups. Conflicting explanations for this preference have included causation from energy minimization with influences by the surrounding microenvironment, known as the thermodynamic remodeling hypothesis, or the inherent enzymatic preference of tafazzin for specific acyl residues.

=== Mitochondria ===
Cardiolipin is a complex glycerophospholipid which contains four acyl groups linked to three glycerol moietie localized in the mitochondrial inner membrane. These acyl groups include oleic acid and linoleic acid. Due to this composition, cardiolipin exhibits a conical structure, which allows for membrane curvature called cristae. Further, CL plays important roles in oxidative phosphorylation by stabilizing the chain complexes with its linkages between acyl chains, binding to the c-rings of ATP synthase for proper function, maintaining respiratory chain supercomplex formation with proteins localized in the inner mitochondrial matrix including ATP/ADP translocase, pyruvate carrier, carnitine carrier, and all of the respiratory chain complexes (I, III, IV, V). Cardiolipin also facilitates proton trapping in the intermembrane space to aid ATP synthase in channeling protons into the mitochondrial matrix. Properly formed CL is critical in maintaining mitochondrial shape, energy production, and protein transport within cells, and remodeling by tafazzin aids in removing and replacing acyl chains damaged by oxidative stress. During apoptosis and similar processes, CL is known to act as a platform for proteins and other machinery involved with its interactions with members of the Bcl-2 family, caspases, Bid, Bax, and Bak.

== Clinical significance ==
Mutations in the TAFAZZIN gene have been associated with a number of mitochondrial deficiencies and associated disorders including Barth syndrome, dilated cardiomyopathy (DCM), hypertrophic DCM, endocardial fibroelastosis, and left ventricular noncompaction (LVNC). TAFAZZIN has also been associated with various cancers, including breast cancer, papillary thyroid carcinoma and non-small cell lung cancer, glioma, gastric cancer, thyroid neoplasms, and rectal cancer.

=== Barth syndrome ===
Barth syndrome (BTHS) is an X-linked disease caused by mutations in the TAFAZZIN gene. More than 160 mutations in the TAFAZZIN gene have been linked to this disease. It is a rare disease, found in 1 out of every 300,000 to 400,000 live births, though it is widely known that the disease is underdiagnosed. Although BTHS occurs almost exclusively in males, there has been one identified case of BTHS in a female patient. Tafazzin is responsible for remodeling of a phospholipid cardiolipin (CL), the signature lipid of the mitochondrial inner membrane. TAFAZZIN gene mutations that cause Barth syndrome result in the production of tafazzin proteins with little or no function. As a result, linoleic acid is not added to cardiolipin, which disrupts normal mitochondrial shape and function, including energy production and protein transport. Barth syndrome patients exhibit defects in cardiolipin metabolism, including aberrant cardiolipin fatty acyl composition, accumulation of monolysocardiolipin (MLCL), and reduced total cardiolipin levels. This may lead to acute metabolic decompensation and sudden death. Tissues with high energy demands, such as the heart and other muscles, are most susceptible to cell death due to reduced energy production in mitochondria and protein transport.

Additionally, affected white blood cells have abnormally shaped mitochondria, which could impair their ability to grow (proliferate) and mature (differentiate), leading to a weakened immune system and recurrent infections. Dysfunctional mitochondria likely lead to other signs and symptoms of Barth syndrome.

Phenotypes of Barth Syndrome encompass a wide range, with cardiovascular, musculoskeletal, neurological, metabolic, and hematologic consequences. Common clinical manifestations include:

- dilated cardiomyopathy (enlarged and weakened heart)
- muscle weakness
- recurrent infections
- short stature
- endocardial fibroelastosis
- growth retardation
- neutropenia
- organic aciduria (3-methylglutaconic acid)

Additional features include hypertrophic cardiomyopathy, isolated noncompaction of left ventricular myocardium (INVM), ventricular arrhythmia, motor delay, poor appetite, fatigue and exercise intolerance, hypoglycemia, lactic acidosis, hyperammonemia, and dramatic late catch-up growth after growth delay throughout childhood.

A c.348C>T mutation resulted in dilated cardiomyopathy with noncompaction of the ventricular myocardium. A patient with a frame shift mutation of c.227delC displayed symptoms of neutropenia, cardiomegaly, and other common symptoms of Barth syndrome. Another c.C153G mutation resulted in severe metabolic acidosis, cardiomegaly, and other major symptoms of Barth syndrome.

There is no known cure for BTHS, and treatment of BTHS is convoluted and delayed due to the disease's varying phenotypes and its sheer complexity. Thus, many treatments focus on cardiovascular and metabolic disorders, rather than treating the symptom itself. Elamipretide, an agent which protects CL from oxidative damage to maintain mitochondrial cristae and oxidative phosphorylation, is currently being tested in clinical trials. Further, dietary fatty acids have been used to enhance bioenergetics and cardiac function in BTHS. However, severe manifestations of the symptoms in BTHS patients require heart transplantation. Statistics show 9 out of 73 (12%) surviving patients who have undergone cardiac transplantation at the last update. Heart transplantation in BTHS patients has generally been successful.

=== Cardiovascular system ===
Cardiomyopathy is a prominent feature of Barth syndrome. The change in acyl chain composition and lipid peroxidation caused by defective tafazzin can cause defective sarcomeric action, which may lead to an insufficient power stroke, severely weakened tissue, enlarged left ventricle, partial or incomplete contraction, and decreased ejection volume. Such consequences contribute to the cardiomyopathic phenotypes of Barth syndrome, marked by a weakened heart and diminished contractility. Alternatively, reactive oxygen species (ROS) has been suggested as the primary cause of cardiovascular impairments in BTHS.

Cardiomyopathy in BTHS is exhibited at varying levels. A cohort study of BTHS patients showed 41.5% of all diagnosed cardiomyopathies in the range from birth to one month of age, and 95% exhibited a history of cardiomyopathy. Furthermore, there have been cases with mild or late-onset cardiomyopathies, such as two infantile patients without cardiomyopathic phenotypes at the time of diagnosis. Cardiomyopathy in Barth syndrome is primarily exhibited in multiple forms, including dilated cardiomyopathy (DCM), left ventricular condition in which the heart becomes weakened and enlarged, and therefore cannot pump blood efficiently. The resulting decrease in blood flow can lead to swelling in the legs and abdomen, fluid in the lungs, and an increased risk of blood clots. Some mutations in the TAFAZZIN gene cause dilated cardiomyopathy without the other features of Barth syndrome. LVNC is a condition in which the left ventricle, characterized by a spongy structure on the ventricular wall, exhibits prominent trabeculations and deep intertrabecular recesses. INVM occurs when the lower left chamber of the heart (left ventricle) does not develop correctly. In INVM, the heart muscle is weakened and cannot pump blood efficiently, frequently causing heart failure. Abnormal heart rhythms (arrhythmias) can also occur.

=== Musculoskeletal ===
Musculoskeletal pathology is exhibited in varying forms in BTHS patients. A common phenotype is both generalized and local weakness. Weakness is exhibited as overt muscle weakness and increased exertional fatigue due to skeletal myopathy. It worsens when present with the cardiovascular symptoms of Barth syndrome. Additional symptoms of musculoskeletal pathology include hypotonia, delayed motor development, short stature, and facial dysmorphia in varying degrees. Furthermore, it has been shown that a downshift in weight, length, and height relative to the normal population is exhibited in BTHS patients.

Treatment for developmental delays have included cornstarch supplementation as an alternative source of glucose. Metabolic deficiencies have been treated by oral arginine and carnitine supplementation, which has been shown to ameliorate cardiac function and muscle weakness in some patients. However, no formal assessment of the utility of carnitine and arginine supplementation has been published, and its uses have only been effective in patients with specific deficiencies.

=== Central nervous system ===
Cognitive impairments are common in BTHS patients in varying degrees. While a higher incidence of cognitive impairment and mild learning and speech difficulties are often manifested, many BTHS patients have also displayed normal cognitive abilities. This shows the limited neurologic involvement in BTHS, despite tafazzin's crucial roles in brain mitochondrial respiration and normal cognitive function. One study has shown that the brain has a distinct CL composition, with more diverse and less tetralinoleoyl-dependent CL. This composition diminishes the need for CL remodeling, resulting in a less tafazzin-dependent composition. Another study found that the brain has a higher concentration of saturated acyl chains. Finally, the brain has a higher ROS scavenging capability, which allows the circumvention of the harmful effects of ROS. These findings explain the neurological phenotypes in BTHS patients.

=== Metabolic disorders ===
Metabolic disorders in BTHS are exhibited in the form of 3-methylglutaconic aciduria (3-MGA), a condition characterized by increased levels of organic acids in urine, including 3‐methylglutaconic acid, 3‐methylglutaric acid, and 2‐ethyl-hydracrylic acid. While 3-MGA is largely excreted in BTHS patients, some patients have been found to have normal levels of organic acids in urine. Treatment of 3-MGA and metabolic deficiencies have included riboflavin or coenzyme Q_{10}, which have shown significant improvement in patients.

=== Neutropenia ===
The major hematologic pathology for BTHS patients is neutropenia, a condition characterized by a decline in total number of neutrophils in circulation with an increase in monocytes and eosinophils and no fluctuations in lymphocytes. Presentation of neutropenia varies from mild to severe, cyclical to non-cyclical, and intermittent to chronic. An absolute neutrophil count of < 500/μL, defined as severe chronic neutropenia (SCN), is the most deleterious form.

=== Cancer ===
TAFAZZIN has been found to be highly expressed in gastric cancer cells resistant to cisplatin. This resistance was identified to be due to the acquired ability of the cancer cells to undergo epithelial-mesenchymal transition (EMT). The findings that TAFAZZIN is involved in inducing EMT as well as its high levels in these cancer cells may point to its involvement in gastric cancer. TAFAZZIN overexpression has been linked to rectal cancer, prostate cancer, thyroid neoplasm, and cervical cancer. In a study of 140 Swedish rectal cancer patients, TAFAZZIN overexpression was associated with an increase in the expression of oncogenes (FXYD-3 and Livin). It was also found to enhance cell anti-apoptosis response and abnormal cell growth and was even found to be an indicator of rectal cancer's stage, type, and progression. Additionally, the levels of TAFAZZIN were connected to the radiotherapy response of the patients, potentially offering insight into cancer recurrence in patients. A potential link between PI3K and TAFAZZIN indicates a possible association between PI3K signaling and TAFAZZIN as both were highly elevated in PTEN mutant cancer cells. In prostate cancer, CL, which is remodeled by tafazzin, was shown to have high palmitoleic acid content, which was found to have the ability to stimulate prostate cancer cell proliferation and reduce the rate of apoptosis. In thyroid neoplasm, TAFAZZIN allows follicular adenomas to be distinguished from follicular carcinomas, while in cervical cancer tafazzin levels increased from normal tissue, to squamous intraepithelial lesions, to squamous cervical carcinoma. Based on studies of cervical cancer progression, it is believed that TAFAZZIN may induce cancer by inhibiting apoptosis and promoting cancer cell growth, viability, and tumorigenesis.

== Interactions ==
Tafazzin has been shown to have protein-protein interactions with the following and more.

- FUT11
- BTRC
- NAGA
- NID2
- ANKRD46
- VWDE
- ITGA8
