= Monolysocardiolipin acyltransferase =

Trifunctional enzyme subunit alpha, mitochondrial

Identifiers
- Symbol: HADHA
- Alt. symbols: MLCL AT-1
- NCBI gene: 3030
- HGNC: 4801
- OMIM: 600890
- RefSeq: NP_000173
- UniProt: P40939

Other data
- EC number: 4.2.1.17
- Locus: Chr. 2 p23.3
Search for
- Structures: Swiss-model
- Domains: InterPro

Monolysocardiolipin acyltransferase (MLCL AT-1) is a mitochondrial acyltransferase that facilitates the remodeling of monolysocardiolipin (MLCL) into cardiolipin.

== History ==
In 1990, biologists Michael Schlame and Bernd Rustow observed the deacylation of cardiolipin into MLCL, which was then converted back into cardiolipin by a protein using linoleoyl coenzyme A, derived from phosphatidylcholine. However, acyltransferase activities involved in the reacylation of MLCL had not been identified or characterized in any mammalian tissue until 1999, by the Hatch lab at the University of Manitoba, in rat heart mitochondria. In 2003, the same lab purified and characterized an MLCL acyltransferase in pig liver mitochondria, and by comparing this protein against a human protein database, they identified a sequenced but uncharacterized human protein as the enzyme responsible in 2009.

== Function ==
MLCL AT-1 catalyzes the transfer of the fatty acid chain attached to a coenzyme A molecule to an available hydroxyl group on MLCL, producing cardiolipin. This lipid remodeling is separate from the cardiolipin synthesis pathway, and is essential to maintain its unique unsaturated fatty acyl composition. MLCL AT-1 typically utilizes linoleoyl coenzyme A, preferred to oleoyl coenzyme A, which is preferred to palmitoyl coenzyme A.

== Activity during apoptosis ==
MLCL AT-1 activity increases in cells cardiac myoblast cells exposed to 2-deoxyglucose-induced apoptosis. MLCL AT-1 activity also increases in a rat model of spontaneously hypertensive heart failure. Since cardiolipin content is significantly diminished in the inner mitochondrial membrane during apoptosis, the increase of lipid remodeling by MLCL AT-1 may be an effort of the cell to maintain normal cardiolipin levels.

== Similarity to mitochondrial trifunctional protein ==
MLCL AT-1 is completely identical to the 59-kDa C-terminal end of mitochondrial trifunctional protein HADHA, suggesting the possibility that the two proteins may be the product of alternative splicing of the same gene. MLCL AT-1 is likely a splice variant of the alpha subunit of MTP.

== Hormone interaction ==
Treatment with thyroxine, a thyroid hormone, can produce an almost two-fold increase in MLCL AT-1 activity in rats.
