= Phosphatidylglycerophosphatase =

Identifiers
- Symbol: PAP2
- Pfam: PF01569
- OPM superfamily: 409
- OPM protein: 5jwy
Available protein structures:
- Pfam: structures / ECOD
- PDB: RCSB PDB; PDBe; PDBj
- PDBsum: structure summary

phosphatidylglycerophosphatase

Identifiers
- EC no.: 3.1.3.27
- CAS no.: 9033-46-9

Databases
- IntEnz: IntEnz view
- BRENDA: BRENDA entry
- ExPASy: NiceZyme view
- KEGG: KEGG entry
- MetaCyc: metabolic pathway
- PRIAM: profile
- PDB structures: RCSB PDB PDBe PDBsum
- Gene Ontology: AmiGO / QuickGO
Search
- PMC: articles
- PubMed: articles
- NCBI: proteins

The enzyme phosphatidylglycerophosphatase (EC 3.1.3.27) catalyzes the following reaction:

phosphatidylglycerophosphate + H_{2}O $\rightleftharpoons$ phosphatidylglycerol + phosphate

This enzyme belongs to the family of hydrolases, specifically those acting on phosphoric monoester bonds. The systematic name is phosphatidylglycerophosphate phosphohydrolase. Other names in common use include phosphatidylglycerol phosphate phosphatase, phosphatidylglycerol phosphatase, and PGP phosphatase. It participates in glycerophospholipid metabolism.

This is a family of proteins that acts as a mitochondrial phosphatase in cardiolipin biosynthesis. Cardiolipin is a unique dimeric phosphoglycerolipid predominantly present in mitochondrial membranes.
