= Body surface area =

Drug calculating formula

In physiology and medicine, the body surface area (BSA) is the measured or calculated surface area of a human body. For many clinical purposes, BSA is a better indicator of metabolic mass than body weight because it is less affected by abnormal adipose mass. Nevertheless, there have been several important critiques of the use of BSA in determining the dosage of medications with a narrow therapeutic index, such as chemotherapy.

Typically, there is a 4–10-fold variation in drug clearance between individuals due to differing the activity of drug elimination processes related to genetic and environmental factors. This can lead to significant overdosing and underdosing (and increased risk of disease recurrence). It is also thought to be a distorting factor in Phase I and II trials that may result in potentially helpful medications being prematurely rejected. The trend to personalized medicine is one approach to counter this weakness.

== Uses ==
Examples of uses of the BSA:

- Renal clearance usually divided by the BSA i.e. per 1.73 m² to gain an appreciation of the true glomerular filtration rate (GFR);
- The Quetelet index uses a somewhat modified form of the BSA.
- The cardiac index is a measure of cardiac output divided by the BSA, giving a better approximation of the effective cardiac output.
- Chemotherapy is often dosed according to the patient's BSA.
- Glucocorticoid dosing is also expressed in terms of BSA for calculating maintenance doses or to compare high dose use with maintenance requirement.

There is some evidence that BSA values are less accurate at extremes of height and weight, where Body Mass Index may be a better estimate (for hemodynamic parameters).

== Calculation ==
Various calculations have been published to arrive at the BSA without direct measurement. In the following formulae, M is the subject's mass, and H is the subject's height.

The most widely used is the Du Bois formula, which has been shown to be equally as effective in estimating body fat in obese and non-obese patients, something the Body mass index fails to do.

$${BSA}=a \times M^{0.425} \times H^{0.725}$$
where $a=71.84 {cm}^{1.275} {kg}^{-0.425}$

The Mosteller formula is also commonly used, and is mathematically simpler:

$${BSA }= b\sqrt{M \times H}$$
where $b=\frac{1000}{6} {cm}^{1.5} {kg}^{-0.5}$, or:
$${BSA }= \sqrt\frac{\mbox{height} \times \mbox{weight} }{3600}$$

Other formulas for BSA include:

Haycock	$c \times M^{0.5378} \times H^{0.3964}$
Gehan and George	$d \times M^{0.51456} \times H^{0.42246}$
Boyd	$e \times ({\frac{M}{1 kg}})^{0.0188log_{10} \frac{f}{M}} \times H^{0.3}$
Fujimoto	$g \times M^{0.444} \times H^{0.663}$
Takahira	$h \times M^{0.425} \times H^{0.725}$
Shuter and Aslani	$i \times M^{0.441} \times H^{0.655}$
Lipscombe	$j \times M^{0.434972} \times H^{0.67844}$
Schlich	$k \times M^{0.46} \times H^{1.08}$ (women)
Schlich	$l \times M^{0.38} \times H^{1.24}$ (men)

where $c= 242.65 {cm}^{1.6036} {kg}^{-0.5378}$, $d= 235 {cm}^{1.57754} kg^{-0.51456}$, $e= 333 {cm}^{1.7}$, $f= 10^\frac{0.6157}{0.0188} kg$, $g=88.83 {cm}^{1.337} {kg}^{0.556}$, $h= 72.41 {cm}^{1.275} {kg}^{-0.425}$, $i= 94.9 {cm}^{1.345} {kg}^{-0.441}$, $j= 87.8108 {cm}^{1.32156} {kg}^{-0.434972}$, $k= 9.75482 {cm}^{0.96} {kg}^{-0.46}$, and $l= 5.79479 {cm}^{0.76} {kg}^{-0.38}$.

For any formula, the units should match. Lipscombe, following Mosteller's reasoning, observed that the formulas obtained by Fujimoto, Shuter and Aslani, Takahira, and Lipscombe are suggestive of $m \times M^{4/9} \times H^{2/3}$, where the coefficient m's numerical value is solely dependent on the density unit, specifically equal to $\frac{800}{9} (\frac{kg}{{cm}^3})^{-\frac{4}{9}}$.

A weight-based formula that does not include a square root (making it easier to use) was proposed by Costeff and recently validated for the pediatric age group. It is $n\frac{4M+o}{M+p}$, where $n= 1m^2$, $o=7 kg$, and $p=90 kg$.

== Average values ==
Average BSA for children of various ages, for men, and for women, can be estimated using statistical survey data and a BSA formula:

Mean male BSA by age
Age or age group	metric		imperial	
Neonate (newborn)	0.243	m^{2}	2.612	ft^{2}
2 years	0.563	m^{2}	6.060	ft^{2}
5 years	0.787	m^{2}	8.471	ft^{2}
10 years	1.236	m^{2}	13.304	ft^{2}
13 years	1.603	m^{2}	17.255	ft^{2}
18 years	1.980	m^{2}	21.313	ft^{2}
20–79 years	2.060	m^{2}	22.173	ft^{2}
80+ years	1.920	m^{2}	20.667	ft^{2}

Mean female BSA by age
Age or age group	metric		imperial	
Neonate (newborn)	0.234	m^{2}	2.519	ft^{2}
2 years	0.540	m^{2}	5.813	ft^{2}
5 years	0.771	m^{2}	8.299	ft^{2}
10 years	1.245	m^{2}	13.401	ft^{2}
13 years	1.550	m^{2}	16.684	ft^{2}
18 years	1.726	m^{2}	18.579	ft^{2}
20–79 years	1.830	m^{2}	19.697	ft^{2}
80+ years	1.638	m^{2}	17.631	ft^{2}

The estimations in the above tables are based weight and height data from the U.S. NCHS National Health and Nutrition Examination Survey (2011-2014).

There was an average BSA of 1.73 m^{2} for 3,000 cancer patients from 1990 to 1998 in a European Organisation for Research and Treatment of Cancer (EORTC) database.

During 2005 there was an average BSA of 1.79 m^{2} for 3,613 adult cancer patients in the UK. Among them, the average BSA for men was 1.91 m^{2} and for women was 1.71 m^{2}.

== See also ==
- Total body surface area
