= Cardiac index =

Haemodynamic parameter

The cardiac index (CI) is a hemodynamic measure that represents the cardiac output (CO) of an individual divided by their body surface area (BSA), expressed in liters per minute per square meter (L/min/m^{2}). This parameter provides a more accurate assessment of heart function relative to the size of the individual, as opposed to absolute cardiac output alone. Cardiac index is crucial in assessing patients with heart failure and other cardiovascular conditions, providing insight into the adequacy of cardiac function in relation to the individual's metabolic needs.

== Calculation ==
The index is usually calculated using the following formula:

$$\text{CI} = \frac{\text{CO}}{\text{BSA}} = \frac{\text{SV}\times\text{HR}}{\text{BSA}}$$

where

- CI - Cardiac index
- BSA - Body surface area
- SV - Stroke volume
- HR - Heart rate
- CO - Cardiac output

=== Body surface area calculation ===
The cardiac index is adjusted for body surface area (BSA), typically calculated using the Mosteller formula. This adjustment allows for standardized comparison across individuals with different body sizes, improving the accuracy of CI measurements.

$BSA (m^2) = \sqrt \left ( \frac{Weight (kg) \times Height (cm) }{3600} \right )$

== Clinical significance ==
Cardiac index is a critical parameter in evaluating cardiac performance and the adequacy of tissue perfusion. In healthy adults, the normal range of cardiac index is generally between 2.6 and 4.2 L/min/m^{2}. However, in healthy older adults, a range of 2.1 to 3.2 L/min/m^{2} has been defined. Values below the normal range may indicate hypoperfusion and are often seen in conditions such as heart failure, hypovolemia, and cardiogenic shock. Conversely, elevated cardiac index values may be observed in hyperdynamic states, such as systemic inflammatory response syndrome (SIRS) or in patients with anemia. The cardiac index is thus a valuable tool in guiding therapeutic interventions in various clinical settings, including intensive care units.

In clinical practice, CI helps tailor therapies such as the administration of vasopressors in septic shock based on real-time assessments from tools like bedside echocardiograms. This metric is essential for evaluating heart performance relative to the body's needs rather than in isolation, making it a key factor in managing various forms of shock.

There are four main types of shock where CI plays a crucial role:

1. Cardiogenic shock: Resulting from heart dysfunction, such as myocardial infarction or heart failure, cardiogenic shock shows a decreased CI due to failure of pump action. An increase in systemic vascular resistance (SVR) is usually observed as the body attempts to compensate for this.
2. Obstructive shock: Caused by obstructions like cardiac tamponade or massive pulmonary embolism, this type of shock also presents with a decreased CI and a compensatory increase in SVR.
3. Hypovolemic shock: This occurs due to significant fluid loss (e.g., hemorrhage or burns), leading to decreased CI and compensatory increase in SVR.
4. Distributive shock: Seen in conditions like septic or anaphylactic shock, the systemic inflammatory response causes widespread vasodilation, leading to decreased SVR, with resultant decrease in CI. The body in this case usually attempts to compensate by increasing the heart rate (HR).

CI is not only important in acute care settings but also in long-term health outcomes. Research, including the Framingham Heart Study, has linked low CI with an increased risk of dementia and Alzheimer's disease. Additionally, higher CI in organ donors has been associated with improved survival rates in heart transplant recipients.

== Measurement techniques ==
Cardiac index can be assessed using a variety of methods, which can be broadly categorized into noninvasive imaging and invasive techniques. The choice of method depends on the patient's condition, the specific clinical requirements, and the desired balance between accuracy and procedural risk.

=== Noninvasive techniques ===
1. Doppler ultrasound: This method estimates blood flow and volume by analyzing the Doppler shift of ultrasound waves. It is cost-effective and provides rapid results, though its accuracy is dependent on the operator's skill.
2. Echocardiography: By combining two-dimensional ultrasound with Doppler measurements, this technique evaluates cardiac function non-invasively. It is highly accurate but requires experienced operators and is more expensive than Doppler ultrasound.
3. Modified CO_{2} Fick method: This approach estimates cardiac output by measuring CO_{2} levels in patients on mechanical ventilation. While accurate, it is limited to specific patient populations and does not measure preload indices.
4. Cardiac MRI: A comprehensive imaging modality that provides detailed assessments of cardiac structure and function, including CI. It is highly accurate but expensive and less accessible than other methods.

=== Invasive techniques ===
1. Oxygen Fick method: This method uses the Fick equation to directly measure cardiac output through pulmonary artery catheterization. It offers high precision but is invasive, time-consuming, and carries risks such as infection and arrhythmias.
2. Lithium dilution cardiac output: This technique involves injecting lithium chloride and measuring its dilution in the bloodstream. It provides accurate results but requires multiple measurements and is invasive.
3. FloTrac system: A minimally invasive device that continuously monitors hemodynamic parameters by analyzing arterial waveform data. It is useful in critical care but less accurate in patients with low cardiac output or certain conditions like advanced liver disease.
