= Elamipretide =

Chemical compound

Clinical data
- Trade names: Forzinity
- Other names: SS-31, MTP-131, Bendavia
- AHFS/Drugs.com: Monograph
- MedlinePlus: a625103
- License data: US DailyMed: Elamipretide
- Routes of administration: Subcutaneous
- ATC code: None

Legal status
- Legal status: US: ℞-only

Identifiers
- IUPAC name: (2S)-6-Amino-2-[[(2S)-2-[[(2R)-2-amino-5-(diaminomethylideneamino)pentanoyl]amino]-3-(4-hydroxy-2,6-dimethylphenyl)propanoyl]amino]-N-[(2S)-1-amino-1-oxo-3-phenylpropan-2-yl]hexanamide
- CAS Number: 736992-21-5; as HCl: 72244098-12-0
- PubChem CID: 11764719
- DrugBank: DB11981
- ChemSpider: 9939410
- UNII: 87GWG91S09; as HCl: E40WZ3BK2D
- KEGG: D10925; as HCl: D11542
- CompTox Dashboard (EPA): DTXSID50471988

Chemical and physical data
- Formula: C_{32}H_{49}N_{9}O_{5}
- Molar mass: 639.802 g·mol^{−1}
- 3D model (JSmol): Interactive image
- SMILES: CC1=CC(O)=CC(C)=C1C[C@H](NC(=O)[C@H](N)CCCNC(N)=N)C(=O)N[C@@H](CCCCN)C(=O)N[C@@H](CC2=CC=CC=C2)C(N)=O
- InChI: InChI=1S/C32H49N9O5/c1-19-15-22(42)16-20(2)23(19)18-27(41-29(44)24(34)11-8-14-38-32(36)37)31(46)39-25(12-6-7-13-33)30(45)40-26(28(35)43)17-21-9-4-3-5-10-21/h3-5,9-10,15-16,24-27,42H,6-8,11-14,17-18,33-34H2,1-2H3,(H2,35,43)(H,39,46)(H,40,45)(H,41,44)(H4,36,37,38)/t24-,25+,26+,27+/m1/s1; Key:SFVLTCAESLKEHH-WKAQUBQDSA-N

Elamipretide, sold under the brand name Forzinity, is a medication used for the treatment of Barth syndrome. Elamipretide is a mitochondrial cardiolipin binder. It is used as the hydrochloride salt. It is given by injection under the skin (subcutaneous).

The most common side effects identified in clinical trials include mild-to-moderate injection site reactions.

Elamipretide was approved for medical use in the United States in September 2025. The US Food and Drug Administration considers it to be a first-in-class medication.

== Medical uses ==
Elamipretide is indicated to improve muscle strength in people with Barth syndrome weighing at least 30 kilograms (66 lb).

Barth syndrome is a rare, serious and life-threatening disease of the mitochondria (the energy-producing parts of cells). Barth syndrome primarily affects males, typically starts with severe heart failure in infancy, and causes premature death. People who survive into adolescence and adulthood often have fatigue, poor stamina, and exercise intolerance. The quality of life and daily functioning of people with Barth syndrome are significantly affected throughout their lives.

Elamipretide has also been researched for numerous other diseases including heart failure, macular degeneration, diabetic foot ulcers and hypertension, though it is currently only medically approved for use in the treatment of Barth syndrome.

== Society and culture ==
=== Legal status ===
Elamipretide was approved for medical use in the United States in September 2025. The US Food and Drug Administration (FDA) granted the application for elamipretide priority review and rare pediatric disease designations. The FDA granted accelerated approval of Forzinity to Stealth Biotherapeutics.

=== Names ===
Elamipretide is the international nonproprietary name.

Elamipretide is sold under the brand name Forzinity.
