= OPA3 =

Protein-coding gene in the species Homo sapiens

Identifiers
- Aliases: OPA3, MGA3, optic atrophy 3 (autosomal recessive, with chorea and spastic paraplegia), outer mitochondrial membrane lipid metabolism regulator, OPA3 outer mitochondrial membrane lipid metabolism regulator, outer mitochondrial membrane lipid metabolism regulator OPA3
- External IDs: OMIM: 606580; MGI: 2686271; HomoloGene: 57022; GeneCards: OPA3; OMA:OPA3 - orthologs

Gene location (Human)
Chr.	Chromosome 19 (human)
Band	19q13.32	Start	45,527,767 bp
Band	19q13.32	End	45,602,212 bp

Gene location (Mouse)
Chr.	Chromosome 7 (mouse)
Band	7|7 A3	Start	18,962,259 bp
Band	7|7 A3	End	18,990,468 bp
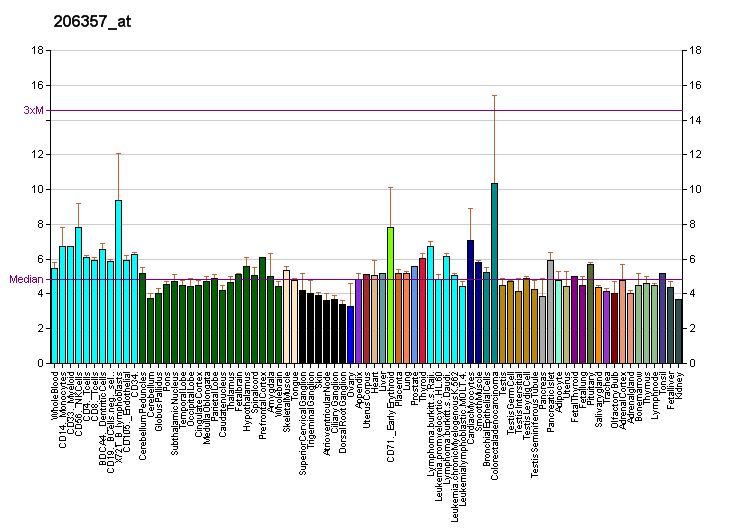
RNA expression pattern
Bgee	Human / Mouse (ortholog); Top expressed in: tendon of biceps brachii; muscle of thigh; apex of heart; gonad; gastrocnemius muscle; left ventricle; gingival epithelium; stromal cell of endometrium; right auricle of heart; buccal mucosa cell / Top expressed in: interventricular septum; triceps brachii muscle; sternocleidomastoid muscle; right ventricle; temporal muscle; digastric muscle; extraocular muscle; vastus lateralis muscle; ankle; epithelium of stomach; More reference expression data
BioGPS	More reference expression data
Orthologs
Species	Human	Mouse
Entrez	80207	403187
Ensembl	ENSG00000125741	ENSMUSG00000052214
UniProt	Q9H6K4	Q505D7
RefSeq (mRNA)	NM_001017989; NM_025136	NM_207525
RefSeq (protein)	NP_001017989; NP_079412	NP_997408
Location (UCSC)	Chr 19: 45.53 – 45.6 Mb	Chr 7: 18.96 – 18.99 Mb
PubMed search
- Wikidata
View/Edit Human	View/Edit Mouse

Optic atrophy 3 protein is a protein that in humans is encoded by the OPA3 gene.

== Clinical significance ==
Costeff syndrome, or 3-methylglutaconic aciduria type III, is a genetic disorder caused by mutations in the OPA3 gene. In addition these mutations disrupt the production of non-shivering heat, as indicated by the dramatic decrease in surface body temperature.

== See also ==
- 3-Methylglutaconic aciduria
