= Hanan Costeff =

Israeli pediatric neurologist

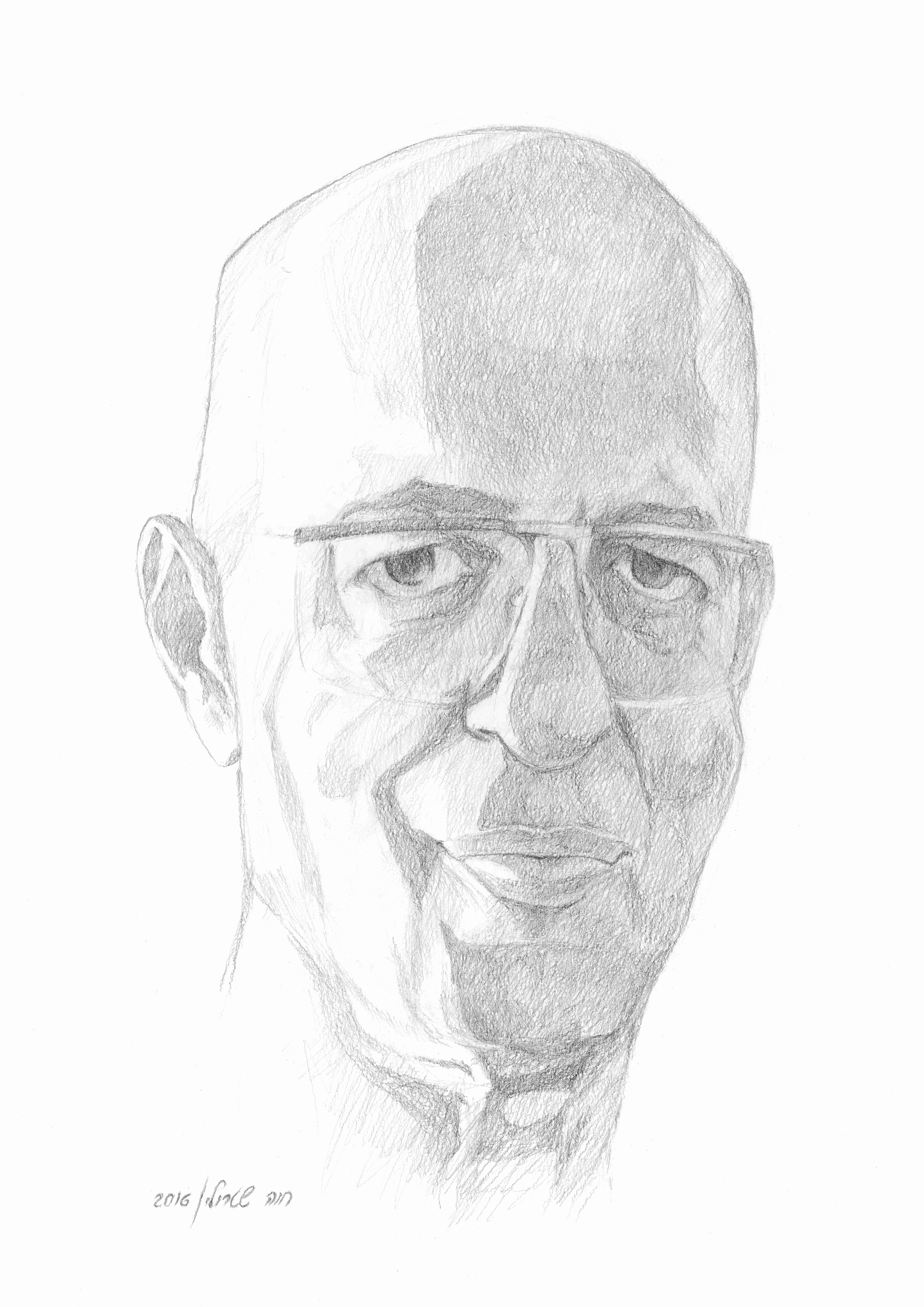
Hanan Costeff

Hanan Costeff (Hebrew: חנן קוסטף) (1926-2005) was an Israeli pediatric neurologist, researcher, and teacher.

== Early life and education ==
Costeff was born on September 14, 1926, to Dr. Harry and Stella Costeff in Peoria, Illinois. His father, Harry Gedalya came to the USA from the Jewish village of Kabaschei in the Russian Empire, served in World War I and later studied to be a pharmacist, and then a medical doctor. He pioneered the use of insulin shock therapy for schizophrenia and founded a private hospital in Peoria.

Hanan grew up in Peoria, served in the navy during the latter part of World War II, and trained as a radio technician. Upon being released, he used GI bill funds to study medicine at the University of Illinois College of Medicine, graduating in 1951. He met and married Ramona Doctor in Chicago in 1951. In 1950, while still a student he visited the newly founded State of Israel, traveled, met some family and managed a children's ward at the then new immigrant camp of Rosh Ha'Ayin. Upon completion of his residency, and the birth of his first son, Philip Avner, the young family immigrated to Israel and joined his parents who had preceded them and were living in Haifa.

== Career ==
Costeff acted as a pediatrician in clinics in Kiryat Shmona, and then Beer Sheva, where he traveled to Kibbutzim and Moshavim treating children in the Tipat Halav (well-baby clinics) outreach program. In one instance he was able to diagnose the earliest case until then of phenylketonuria, and was noticed by the head of the clinic. In 1963 the family, that now included Judy and Gady who were born in 1958 and 1961 respectively, traveled for a two-year post-doctorate at the Child Study Center at Yale University, where Hanan trained as a pediatric neurologist.

The family returned to Israel, with Hanan chosen to head up the Child Development Unit at the Tel Hashomer Hospital, where he worked until 1973. He was then asked to set up the Child Development Center at the Leowienstein Rehabilitation Medical center, where he worked till his retirement in 1998. Following his retirement he re-invented himself and became a recognized medical expert for the courts, as well as working in the Maccabbi HMO in his specialty.

== Research ==
Costeff published approximately 40 original research papers over his career. He was as much a researcher as a medical practitioner. His interest ranged over a wide scope, and he was self-trained in a variety of disciplines and techniques making him somewhat of a renaissance figure. These included a working knowledge of statistics, genetics, neurology to name a few. His first paper was authored during his post-doctorate, and was an algebraic formula to find a practical method of calculating the surface area of a body, useful for calculating some dosages. He taught at the Tel Aviv University School of Medicine, as well as throughout his career, and he established a generation of pediatric neurologists in Israel who looked up to him as their mentor. A syndrome first described by him carries his name: the Costeff Syndrome.

His papers pioneered new ways of looking at diagnosis and treatment of intellectual disability with an emphasis on challenging entrenched theories. He was essentially a man of truth and he often found himself in the minority. He gave testimony about medical neglect in the Beit Tina trial, leading to a judgement against a decorated Army doctor, something that at the time was unheard of. He worked with the Knesset committee to enact a law in Israel that would ensure hospitals that lost medical files would become liable for the damages. He developed tests to verify the need and efficacy of the widespread use of Ritalin, and was concerned about the misuse of the drug in schools and by teachers.

He died in 2005, in his Ramat HaSharon home, after a 15 year long fight with several forms of cancer and Parkinson's disease.
