= Shotgun lipidomics =

In lipidomics, the process of shotgun lipidomics (named by analogy with shotgun sequencing) uses analytical chemistry to investigate the biological function, significance, and sequelae of alterations in lipids and protein constituents mediating lipid metabolism, trafficking, or biological function in cells. Lipidomics has been greatly facilitated by recent advances in, and novel applications of, electrospray ionization mass spectrometry (ESI/MS).

Lipidomics is a research field that studies the pathways and networks of cellular lipids in biological systems (i.e., lipidomes) on a large scale. It involves the identification and quantification of the thousands of cellular lipid molecular species and their interactions with other lipids, proteins, and other moieties in vivo. Investigators in lipidomics examine the structures, functions, interactions, and dynamics of cellular lipids and the dynamic changes that occur during pathophysiologic perturbations. Lipidomic studies play an essential role in defining the biochemical mechanisms of lipid-related disease processes through identifying alterations in cellular lipid metabolism, trafficking and homeostasis. The two major platforms currently used for lipidomic analyses are HPLC-MS and shotgun lipidomics.

== History ==
Shotgun lipidomics was developed by Richard W. Gross and Xianlin Han, by employing ESI intrasource separation techniques. Individual molecular species of most major and many minor lipid classes can be fingerprinted and quantitated directly from biological lipid extracts without the need for chromatographic purification.

== Advantages ==
Shotgun lipidomics is fast, highly sensitive, and it can identify hundreds of lipids missed by other methods — all with a much smaller tissue sample so that specific cells or minute biopsy samples can be examined.
