= ZNG1A =

Protein-coding gene in humans

Identifiers
- Aliases: ZNG1A, COBP, COBW domain containing 1, CBWD1, Zn regulated GTPase metalloprotein activator 1A
- External IDs: OMIM: 611078; MGI: 2385089; GeneCards: ZNG1A

Gene location (Human)
Chr.	Chromosome 9 (human)
Band	9p24.3	Start	121,038 bp
Band	9p24.3	End	179,147 bp

Gene location (Mouse)
Chr.	Chromosome 19 (mouse)
Band	19|19 B	Start	24,897,280 bp
Band	19|19 B	End	24,938,974 bp
RNA expression pattern
Bgee	Human / Mouse (ortholog); Top expressed in: monocyte; body of pancreas; human kidney; left adrenal cortex; islet of Langerhans; right adrenal cortex; Achilles tendon; testicle; gastric mucosa; endometrium / Top expressed in: spermatocyte; morula; spermatid; seminiferous tubule; tail of embryo; primitive streak; interventricular septum; lumbar spinal ganglion; muscle of thigh; embryo; More reference expression data
BioGPS	n/a
Orthologs
Databases	NCBI: entry; OMA: entry
Species	Human	Mouse
Entrez	55871	226043
Ensembl	ENSG00000172785	ENSMUSG00000024878
UniProt	Q9BRT8	Q8VEH6
RefSeq (mRNA)	NM_001145355; NM_001145356; NM_018491	NM_146097
RefSeq (protein)	NP_001138827; NP_001138828; NP_060961	NP_666209
Location (UCSC)	Chr 9: 0.12 – 0.18 Mb	Chr 19: 24.9 – 24.94 Mb
PubMed search
- Wikidata
View/Edit Human	View/Edit Mouse

Zinc-regulated GTPase metalloprotein activator 1A is a protein that in humans is encoded by the ZNG1A gene (previously CBWD1). Based on studies in mice, this protein functions to activate certain metalloproteins like METAP1 by directly transferring zinc to them.
