= Phosphatidate cytidylyltransferase =

phosphatidate cytidylyltransferase

Identifiers
- EC no.: 2.7.7.41
- CAS no.: 9067-83-8

Databases
- IntEnz: IntEnz view
- BRENDA: BRENDA entry
- ExPASy: NiceZyme view
- KEGG: KEGG entry
- MetaCyc: metabolic pathway
- PRIAM: profile
- PDB structures: RCSB PDB PDBe PDBsum
- Gene Ontology: AmiGO / QuickGO
Search
- PMC: articles
- PubMed: articles
- NCBI: proteins

Cytidylyltransferase family

Identifiers
- Symbol: CTP_transf_1
- Pfam: PF01148
- InterPro: IPR000374
- PROSITE: PDOC01019
- OPM superfamily: 414
- OPM protein: 4q2e
Available protein structures:
- Pfam: structures / ECOD
- PDB: RCSB PDB; PDBe; PDBj
- PDBsum: structure summary

Phosphatidate cytidylyltransferase (EC 2.7.7.41) (also known as CDP- diacylglycerol synthase) (CDS) is the enzyme that catalyzes the synthesis of CDP-diacylglycerol from cytidine triphosphate and phosphatidate.

CTP + phosphatidate $\rightleftharpoons$ diphosphate + CDP-diacylglycerol

Thus, the two substrates of this enzyme are cytidine triphosphate, or CTP, and phosphatidate, whereas its two products are diphosphate and CDP-diacylglycerol.

CDP-diacylglycerol is an important branch point intermediate in both prokaryotic and eukaryotic organisms. CDS is a membrane-bound enzyme.

This enzyme belongs to the family of transferases, specifically those transferring phosphorus-containing nucleotide groups (nucleotidyltransferases). The systematic name of this enzyme class is CTP:phosphatidate cytidylyltransferase. Other names in common use include CDP diglyceride pyrophosphorylase, CDP-diacylglycerol synthase, CDP-diacylglyceride synthetase, cytidine diphosphoglyceride pyrophosphorylase, phosphatidate cytidyltransferase, phosphatidic acid cytidylyltransferase, CTP:1,2-diacylglycerophosphate-cytidyl transferase, CTP-diacylglycerol synthetase, DAG synthetase, and CDP-DG. This enzyme participates in glycerophospholipid metabolism and phosphatidylinositol signaling system.
