= Monolysocardiolipin =

Chemical structure of MLCL backbone

Monolysocardiolipin (MLCL) is a phospholipid with three fatty acid chains located in the inner membrane of mitochondria.

MLCL is normally present as part of the metabolic cycle of mitochondrial lipids, such as cardiolipin. It is remodeled by the enzymes monolysocardiolipin acyltransferase, lysocardiolipin acyltransferase, and tafazzin, which transfer a fourth fatty acid chain onto the phospholipid.
