= Noncompaction cardiomyopathy =

Congenital disease of heart muscle

- Other names: Spongiform cardiomyopathy
- Noncompaction cardiomyopathy is inherited in an autosomal dominant manner
- Specialty: Cardiology

Noncompaction cardiomyopathy (NCC) is a rare congenital disease of heart muscle that affects both children and adults. It results from abnormal prenatal development of heart muscle.

During development, the majority of the heart muscle is a sponge-like meshwork of interwoven myocardial fibers. As normal development progresses, these trabeculated structures undergo significant compaction that transforms them from spongy to solid. This process is particularly apparent in the ventricles, and particularly so in the left ventricle. Noncompaction cardiomyopathy results when there is failure of this process of compaction. Because the consequence of non-compaction is particularly evident in the left ventricle, the condition is also called left ventricular noncompaction. Other hypotheses and models have been proposed, none of which is as widely accepted as the noncompaction model.

Symptoms range greatly in severity. Most are a result of a poor pumping performance by the heart. The disease can be associated with other problems with the heart and the body.

== Signs and symptoms ==
Subjects' symptoms from non-compaction cardiomyopathy range widely. It is possible to be diagnosed with the condition, yet not to have any of the symptoms associated with heart disease. Likewise it is possible to have severe congestive heart failure, even though the condition is present from birth, which may only manifest itself later in life. Differences in symptoms between adults and children are also prevalent with adults more likely to have heart failure and children from depression of systolic function.

Common symptoms associated with a reduced pumping performance of the heart include:

- Breathlessness
- Fatigue
- Swelling of the ankles
- Limited physical capacity and exercise intolerance

Two conditions though that are more prevalent in noncompaction cardiomyopathy are: tachyarrhythmia which can lead to sudden cardiac death and clotting of the blood in the heart.

=== Complications ===
The presence of NCC can also lead to other complications around the heart and elsewhere in the body. These are not necessarily common complications and no paper has yet commented on how frequently these complications occur with NCC as well.

- Cardiac
  - Abnormalities of the origin of the left coronary artery
  - Pulmonary atresia
  - Stenosis
  - Right or Left ventricle obstruction
  - Hypoplastic left ventricle
  - Mitral regurgitation
- Neuromuscular (Pertaining to both nerves and muscles)
  - Becker's muscular dystrophy
  - Mitochondrial myopathy
  - Polyneuropathy and metabolic myopathy
- Genetic related
  - Emery–Dreifuss muscular dystrophy
  - Myotubular cardiomyopathy
  - Barth syndrome

== Genetics ==
The American Heart Association's 2006 classification of cardiomyopathies considers noncompaction cardiomyopathy a genetic cardiomyopathy. Mutations in LDB3 (also known as "Cypher/ZASP") have been described in patients with the condition. There is recent information in which NCC has been seen in combination with 1q21.1 deletion Syndrome. Furthermore, mutations in DES (desmin), TTN (titin), RBM20 and LMNA could be detected in a large cohort of LVNC patients. Loss-of-function variants in the NONO gene have been associated with an X-linked form of noncompaction cardiomyopathy in males who also often present with developmental delays. TPM1 has also been implicated in development of the disease.

== Diagnosis ==
Trabeculation of the ventricles is normal, as are prominent, discrete muscular bundles greater than 2mm. In non-compaction there are excessively prominent trabeculations. Echocardiography is the reference standard for diagnosing NCC, although it can be well defined by computer tomography scan, positron emission tomography and magnetic resonance imaging. Chin, et al., described echocardiographic method to distinguish non-compaction from normal trabeculation. They described a ratio of the distance from the trough and peak, of the trabeculations, to the epicardial surface. Non-compaction is diagnosed when the trabeculations are more than twice the thickness of the underlying ventricular wall.

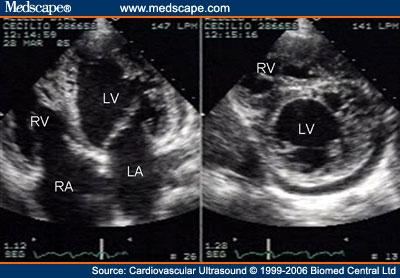
Two-dimensional apical four chamber and parasternal short axis images at the level of the ventricles show dilatation of both ventricles, multiple trabeculae and intertrabecular recesses in inferior, lateral, anterior walls, middle and apical portions of the septum and apex of the left ventricle.

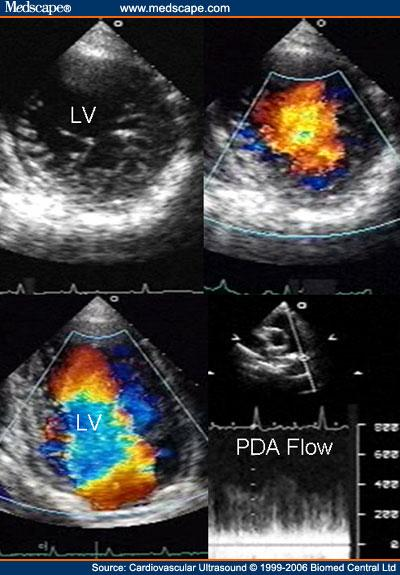
Transthoracic two-dimensional study with color and continuous wave Doppler shows left ventricular noncompaction associated with patent ductus arteriosus (PDA).

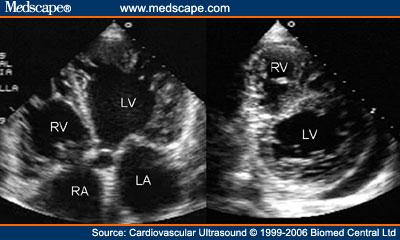
Transthoracic two-dimensional echocardiogram in apical four chamber and parasternal short axis at the level of both ventricles demonstrate dilatation, deep trabeculae and intertrabecular recesses in the inferior, lateral, anterior walls, middle and apical portions of the septum and apex of the left ventricle.

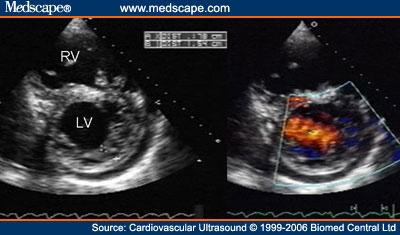
Two-dimensional parasternal and color Doppler images at the level of both ventricles that show the noncompacted:compacted wall ratio and how the color enters the intertrabecular recesses

=== Differential diagnosis ===
Heart conditions that noncompaction cardiomyopathy needs to be distinguished from include other types of congenital heart disease (which may coexist); other causes of heart failure, like dilated cardiomyopathy; and alternative causes of increased myocardial thickness, like hypertrophic or hypertensive cardiomyopathy.

The high number of misdiagnoses can be attributed to non-compaction cardiomyopathy being first reported in 1990; diagnosis is therefore often overlooked or delayed. Advances in medical imaging equipment have made it easier to diagnose the condition, particularly with the wider use of MRIs.

== Management ==
One paper has listed the various types of management of care that have been used for various types of NCC. These are similar to management programs for other types of cardiomyopathies which include the use of ACE inhibitors, beta blockers and aspirin therapy to relieve the pressure on the heart, surgical options such as the installation of pacemaker is also an option for those thought to be at a high risk of arrhythmia problems.

In severe cases, where NCC has led to heart failure, with resulting surgical treatment including a heart valve operation, or a heart transplant.

=== Prognosis ===
Due to non-compaction cardiomyopathy being a relatively new disease, its impact on human life expectancy is not very well understood. In a 2005 study that documented the long-term follow-up of 34 patients with NCC, 35% had died at the age of 42 +/- 40 months, with a further 12% having to undergo a heart transplant due to heart failure. However, this study was based upon symptomatic patients referred to a tertiary-care center, and so were experiencing more severe forms of NCC than might be found typically in the population. Sedaghat-Hamedani et al. also showed the clinical course of symptomatic LVNC can be severe. In this study cardiovascular events were significantly more frequent in LVNC patients compared with an age-matched group of patients with non-ischemic dilated cardiomyopathy (DCM). As NCC is a genetic disease, immediate family members are being tested as a precaution, which is turning up more supposedly healthy people with NCC who are asymptomatic. The long-term prognosis for these people is currently unknown.

== Epidemiology ==
Due to its recent establishment as a diagnosis, and it being unclassified as a cardiomyopathy according to the WHO, it is not fully understood how common the condition is. Some reports suggest that it is in the order of 0.12 cases per 100,000. The low number of reported cases though is due to the lack of any large population studies into the disease and have been based primarily upon patients with advanced heart failure. A similar situation occurred with hypertrophic cardiomyopathy, which was initially considered very rare; however is now thought to occur in one in every 200 to 500 people in the population, depending on the population.

Again due to this condition being established as a diagnosis recently, there are ongoing discussions as to its nature, and to various points such as the ratio of compacted to non-compacted at different age stages. However it is universally understood that non-compaction cardiomyopathy will be characterized anatomically by deep trabeculations in the ventricular wall, which define recesses communicating with the main ventricular chamber. Major clinical correlates include systolic and diastolic dysfunction, associated at times with systemic embolic events.

== History ==
Non-compaction cardiomyopathy was first identified as an isolated condition in 1984 by Engberding and Benber. They reported on a 33-year-old female presenting with exertional dyspnea and palpitations. Investigations concluded persistence of myocardial sinusoids (now termed non-compaction). Prior to this report, the condition was only reported in association with other cardiac anomalies, namely pulmonary or aortic atresia. Myocardial sinusoids is considered not an accurate term as endothelium lines the intertrabecular recesses.

== See also ==
- Barth syndrome
- Emery–Dreifuss muscular dystrophy
- Myotubular myopathy
