= Barth syndrome =

Human genetic metabolism disorder

- Other names: 3-Methylglutaconic aciduria type II, X-linked cardioskeletal myopathy and neutropenia, cardioskeletal myopathy with neutropenia and abnormal mitochondria, cardioskeletal myopathy-neutropenia syndrome
- Cardiolipin
- Specialty: Endocrinology
- Symptoms: Dilated cardiomyopathy, neutropenia, short stature, muscle weakness
- Complications: Heart failure, delayed motor skills, infections
- Onset: Infancy
- Causes: Genetic mutation
- Prognosis: Reduced life expectancy
- Frequency: 1–9 per 1,000,000

Barth syndrome (BTHS) is an ultra-rare, but serious X-linked genetic disorder, caused by pathogenic variants in the TAFAZZIN gene, which leads to an inborn error of lipid metabolism. It may affect multiple body systems (though mainly characterized by pronounced pediatric-onset cardiomyopathy), and is potentially fatal. The syndrome is diagnosed almost exclusively in males.

== Signs and symptoms ==
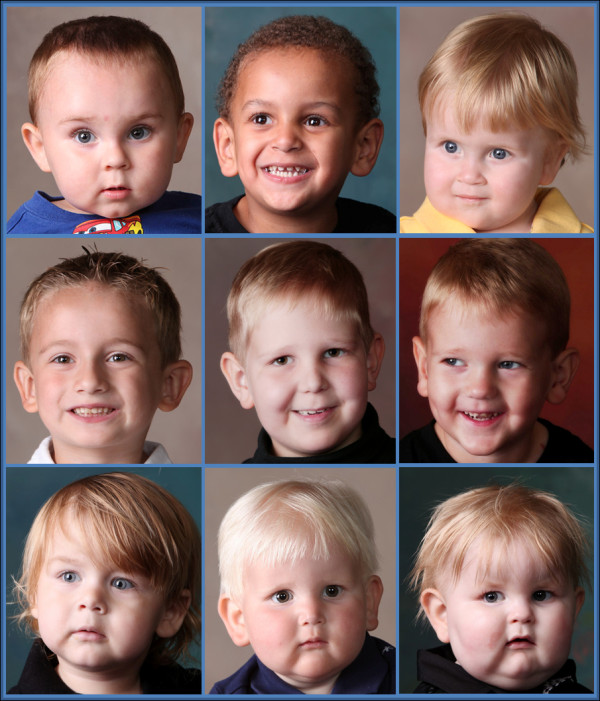
Characteristic facial features of boys with Barth syndrome.

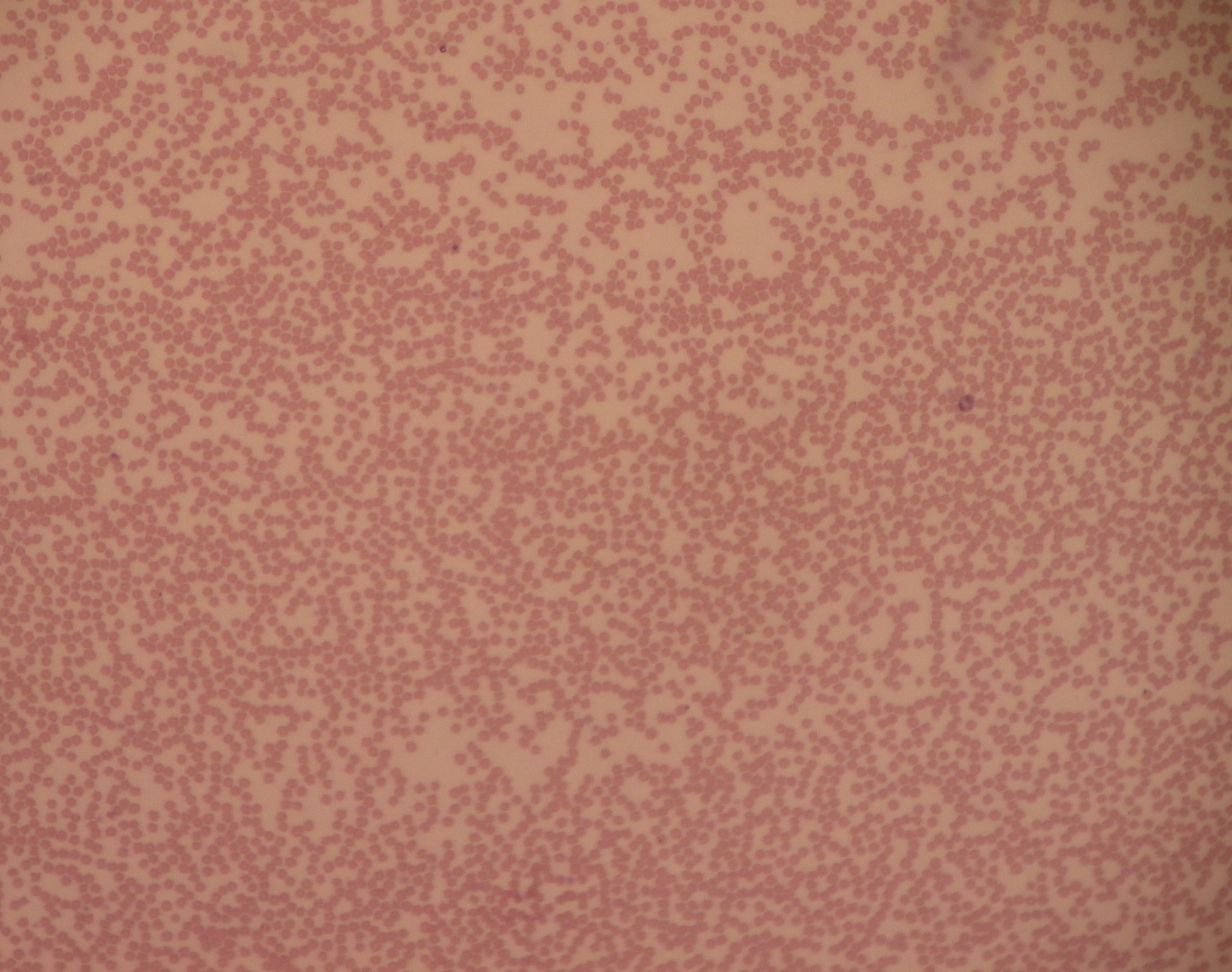
Neutropenia

Though not always present, the cardinal characteristics of this multi-system disorder include: cardiomyopathy (dilated or hypertrophic, possibly with left ventricular noncompaction and/or endocardial fibroelastosis), neutropenia (chronic, cyclic, irregular, or intermittent), underdeveloped skeletal musculature and muscle weakness, growth delay, exercise intolerance, gastrointestinal issues, debilitating fatigue, cardiolipin abnormalities, and 3-methylglutaconic aciduria. It can be associated with stillbirth.

Barth syndrome is manifested in a variety of ways at birth including cardiomyopathy, heart failure, neutropenia, feeding difficulty or failure to thrive, and hypotonia. As patients progress into childhood, their height and weight lag significantly behind average. While most patients express normal intelligence, a proportion of patients also exhibit mild learning difficulties and motor development delay. Physical activity is also hindered due to diminished muscular development and muscular hypotonia. Growth accelerates during puberty, and many patients reach a normal adult height.

Cardiomyopathy is one of the more severe manifestations of Barth syndrome. The myocardium is dilated, reducing the systolic pump of the ventricles. For this reason, most patients have left myocardial thickening (hypertrophy). While cardiomyopathy can be life-threatening, it is commonly resolved or substantially improved in Barth syndrome patients after puberty.

Neutropenia, a granulocyte disorder that results in a low production of neutrophils, the body's primary defenders against bacterial infections, is another severe manifestation of Barth syndrome. In general, lower levels of neutrophils render a patient more vulnerable to bacterial infections; in Barth syndrome patients, however, there are reports of relatively fewer bacterial infections as compared to non-Barth patients with neutropenia.

== Cause ==
The gene TAFAZZIN (previously TAZ, also known as G4.5) is highly expressed in cardiac and skeletal muscle; its gene product, tafazzin, functions as an acyltransferase in complex lipid metabolism. Any type of mutation of TAFAZZIN (missense, nonsense, deletion, frameshift, and/or splicing) is closely associated with Barth syndrome.

In 2008, Dr. Kulik found that every patient with Barth syndrome that he tested had abnormalities in their cardiolipin, a lipid found inside the mitochondria of cells. Cardiolipin is intimately connected with the electron transport chain proteins and the membrane structure of the mitochondrion, the energy-producing organelle of the cell. iPLA2-VIA has been suggested as a target for treatment.

The human tafazzin gene is over 10,000 base pairs in length, the full-length mRNA, NM_000116, being 1919 nucleotides long, encoding 11 exons with a predicted protein length of 292 amino acids and a molecular weight of 33.5 kDa. It is located at Xq28; the long arm of the X chromosome. This explains the X-linked nature of Barth syndrome.

There are some case reports of women who are asymptomatic carriers of the TAFAZZIN mutation. Any of their children might inherit the modified gene with a 50% probability, with the males developing Barth syndrome and the females going on to be carriers themselves. Thus, it is vitally important to take familial histories of Barth syndrome patients to determine genetic risk. Ideally, any male who is matrilineally related to an individual with Barth syndrome should be tested for TAFAZZIN mutation(s). Because the phenotype can vary widely, even among affected siblings, symptomatology (or lack thereof) by itself is insufficient for diagnosis.

== Diagnosis ==
Early diagnosis of the syndrome is complicated, but of critical importance. Clinical presentation in Barth syndrome is highly variable, with the only common denominator being early-onset and pronounced cardiomyopathy. Diagnosis is established based upon several tests, among which can be blood tests (neutropenia, white blood cell count), urinalysis (increased urinary organic acid levels), echocardiography (cardiac ultrasound, to assess (and detect abnormalities in) the heart's structure, function and condition), and, with reasonable suspicion of Barth syndrome, DNA sequencing (to verify TAFAZZIN gene status).

=== Differential diagnosis ===
Based on symptoms at time of presentation, the differential diagnosis may include other hereditary and/or nutritional causes of (dilated) cardiomyopathy and (cyclic or idiopathic) neutropenia.

== Treatment ==
Elamipretide (Forzinity) was approved for medical use in the United States in September 2025.

== Epidemiology ==
Being X-linked, Barth syndrome has been predominantly diagnosed in males (as of July 2009: 120+ males), although by 2012 a female case had been reported.

The syndrome is believed to be severely under-reported due to the complexity of (early) diagnosis. Reports on its incidence and prevalence in the international literature vary; around 1 in every 454,000 individuals are thought to have Barth syndrome. Incidence has been estimated at anywhere between 1:140,000 (South West England, South Wales) and 1:300,000 – 1:400,000 live births (United States). Geographical distribution is homogenous, with patients (and their family members) on every continent (with known cases in, for example, the US, Canada, Europe, Japan, South Africa, Kuwait, and Australia).

== History ==
The syndrome was named for Dr. Peter Barth (b. 1932), a Dutch pediatric neurologist, for his research into and the discovery of the syndrome in 1983. He described a pedigree chart, showing that this is an inherited trait and not a 'communicated' (i.e. infectious) disease.

== See also ==
- 3-Methylglutaconic aciduria
- noncompaction cardiomyopathy: mutations to the affected genes in Barth syndrome are also present here.
