= Long-chain 3-hydroxyacyl-coenzyme A dehydrogenase deficiency =

- Other names: LCHAD deficiency
- Long-chain 3-hydroxyacyl-coenzyme; A dehydrogenase deficiency has an autosomal recessive pattern of inheritance.

Long-chain 3-hydroxyacyl-coenzyme A dehydrogenase deficiency is a rare autosomal recessive fatty acid oxidation disorder that prevents the body from converting certain fats into energy. This can become life-threatening, particularly during periods of fasting.

Schematic demonstrating mitochondrial fatty acid beta-oxidation and effects of LCHAD deficiency

== Symptoms and signs ==
Typically, initial signs and symptoms of this disorder occur during infancy or early childhood and can include feeding difficulties, lethargy, hypoglycemia, hypotonia, liver problems, and abnormalities in the retina. Muscle pain, a breakdown of muscle tissue, and abnormalities in the nervous system that affect arms and legs (peripheral neuropathy) may occur later in childhood. There is also a risk for complications such as life-threatening heart and breathing problems, coma, and sudden unexpected death. Episodes of LCHAD deficiency can be triggered by periods of fasting or by illnesses such as viral infections.

== Genetics ==
Mutations in the HADHA gene lead to inadequate levels of an enzyme called long-chain 3-hydroxyacyl-coenzyme A (CoA) dehydrogenase, which is part of a protein complex known as mitochondrial trifunctional protein. Long-chain fatty acids from food and body fat cannot be metabolized and processed without sufficient levels of this enzyme. As a result, these fatty acids are not converted to energy, which can lead to characteristic features of this disorder, such as lethargy and hypoglycemia. Long-chain fatty acids or partially metabolized fatty acids may build up in tissues and damage the liver, heart, retina, and muscles, causing more serious complications.

== Diagnosis ==
Diagnoses are typically made based on newborn screening done from blood obtained using a heel prick at birth. Prior to widespread inclusion of FAO (fatty acid oxidation) disorders in newborn screening tests, diagnosis typically occurred as a result of children presenting for medical attention having hypoglycemic hypoketotic crisis.

== Prognosis ==
A 2001 study followed up on 50 patients. Of these 38% died in childhood while the rest suffered from problems with morbidity. However, with certain dietary and lifestyle choices, it is possible for sufferers of LCHAD to live comfortable and happy lives.

== See also ==
- Medium chain acyl dehydrogenase deficiency
