= HADHA =

Protein-coding gene in the species Homo sapiens

Identifiers
- Aliases: HADHA, hydroxyacyl-CoA dehydrogenase/3-ketoacyl-CoA thiolase/enoyl-CoA hydratase (trifunctional protein), alpha subunit, ECHA, GBP, HADH, LCEH, LCHAD, MTPA, TP-ALPHA, hydroxyacyl-CoA dehydrogenase trifunctional multienzyme complex subunit alpha
- External IDs: OMIM: 600890; MGI: 2135593; GeneCards: HADHA
Enzyme activity
EC #	BRENDA	ExPASy	KEGG	MetaCyc
1.1.1.211	↗	↗	↗	↗
4.2.1.17	↗	↗	↗	↗

Gene location (Human)
Chr.	Chromosome 2 (human)
Band	2p23.3	Start	26,190,635 bp
Band	2p23.3	End	26,244,672 bp

Gene location (Mouse)
Chr.	Chromosome 5 (mouse)
Band	5|5 B1	Start	30,323,302 bp
Band	5|5 B1	End	30,360,160 bp
RNA expression pattern
Bgee	Human / Mouse (ortholog); Top expressed in: jejunal mucosa; gastrocnemius muscle; left ventricle; apex of heart; duodenum; Skeletal muscle tissue of rectus abdominis; right auricle of heart; mucosa of transverse colon; muscle of thigh; rectum / Top expressed in: myocardium of ventricle; right ventricle; cardiac muscles; brown adipose tissue; muscle of thigh; genital tubercle; extraocular muscle; soleus muscle; epithelium of small intestine; digastric muscle; More reference expression data
BioGPS	n/a
Gene ontology
Molecular function	fatty-acyl-CoA binding; acetyl-CoA C-acyltransferase activity; protein-containing complex binding; NAD binding; enoyl-CoA hydratase activity; acetyl-CoA C-acetyltransferase activity; long-chain-3-hydroxyacyl-CoA dehydrogenase activity; protein binding; catalytic activity; lyase activity; oxidoreductase activity; long-chain-enoyl-CoA hydratase activity; 3-hydroxyacyl-CoA dehydrogenase activity
Cellular component	mitochondrion; mitochondrial inner membrane; mitochondrial nucleoid; mitochondrial fatty acid beta-oxidation multienzyme complex; extracellular matrix
Biological process	lipid metabolism; fatty acid metabolic process; response to insulin; fatty acid beta-oxidation; metabolism; cardiolipin acyl-chain remodeling
Sources:Amigo / QuickGO
Orthologs
Databases	NCBI: entry; OMA: entry
Species	Human	Mouse
Entrez	3030	97212
Ensembl	ENSG00000084754	ENSMUSG00000025745
UniProt	P40939	Q8BMS1
RefSeq (mRNA)	NM_000182	NM_178878
RefSeq (protein)	NP_000173	NP_849209
Location (UCSC)	Chr 2: 26.19 – 26.24 Mb	Chr 5: 30.32 – 30.36 Mb
PubMed search
- Wikidata
View/Edit Human	View/Edit Mouse

Trifunctional enzyme subunit alpha, mitochondrial also known as hydroxyacyl-CoA dehydrogenase/3-ketoacyl-CoA thiolase/enoyl-CoA hydratase (trifunctional protein), alpha subunit is a protein that in humans is encoded by the HADHA gene. Mutations in HADHA have been associated with trifunctional protein deficiency or long-chain 3-hydroxyacyl-coenzyme A dehydrogenase deficiency.

== Structure ==
HADHA is an 82.9 kDa protein composed of 763 amino acids.

The mitochondrial membrane-bound heterocomplex is composed of four alpha and four beta subunits, with the alpha subunit catalyzing the 3-hydroxyacyl-CoA dehydrogenase and enoyl-CoA hydratase activities. The genes of the alpha and beta subunits of the mitochondrial trifunctional protein are located adjacent to each other in the human genome in a head-to-head orientation.

== Function ==
This gene encodes the alpha subunit of the mitochondrial trifunctional protein, which catalyzes the last three steps of mitochondrial beta-oxidation of long chain fatty acids. The enzyme converts medium- and long-chain 2-enoyl-CoA compounds into the following 3-ketoacyl-CoA when NAD is solely present, and acetyl-CoA when NAD and CoASH are present. The alpha subunit catalyzes this reaction, and is attached to HADHB, which catalyzes the last step of the reaction.

== Clinical significance ==
Mutations in this gene result in trifunctional protein deficiency or long-chain 3-hydroxyacyl-coenzyme A dehydrogenase deficiency.

The most common form of the mutation is G1528C, in which the guanine at the 1528th position is changed to a cytosine. The gene mutation creates a protein deficiency that is associated with impaired oxidation of long-chain fatty acids that can lead to sudden infant death. Clinical manifestations of this deficiency can include myopathy, cardiomyopathy, episodes of coma, and hypoglycemia. Long-chain L-3-hydroxyacyl-coenzyme A dehydrogenase deficiency is associated with some pregnancy-specific disorders, including preeclampsia, HELLP syndrome (hemolysis, elevated liver enzymes, low platelets), hyperemesis gravidarum, acute fatty liver of pregnancy, and maternal floor infarct of the placenta.

From a clinical perspective, HADHA might also be a useful marker to predict resistance to certain types of chemotherapy in patients with lung cancer.

== Interactions ==
HADHA has been shown to have 142 binary protein-protein interactions including 117 co-complex interactions. HADHA appears to interact with GABARAP, MAP1LC3B, TRAF6, GABARAPL2, GABARAPL1, GAST, BCAR3, EPB41, TNFRSF1A, HLA-B, NFKB2, MAP3K1, IKBKE, PRKAB1, RIPK3, CD74, NR4A1, cdsA, mtaD, ATXN2L, ABCF2, and MAPK3.
