= Acute fatty liver of pregnancy =

- Specialty: Obstetrics, Perinatology, Hepatology
- Complications: Death, Disseminated intravascular coagulation
- Usual onset: Third trimester of pregnancy
- Causes: Long-chain 3-hydroxyacyl-coenzyme A dehydrogenase deficiency
- Diagnostic method: Clinical history and physical examination Liver biopsy (rarely needed)
- Treatment: Prompt delivery of the infant, Intensive supportive care Liver transplantation
- Frequency: 1 in 7,000 to 1 in 15,000 pregnancies
- Deaths: 18%

Acute fatty liver of pregnancy is a rare life-threatening complication of pregnancy that occurs in the third trimester or the immediate period after delivery. It is thought to be caused by a disordered metabolism of fatty acids by mitochondria in the fetus, caused by long-chain 3-hydroxyacyl-coenzyme A dehydrogenase deficiency. This leads to decreased metabolism of long-chain fatty acids by the fetoplacental unit, causing a subsequent rise in hepatotoxic fatty acids in maternal plasma. The condition was previously thought to be universally fatal, but aggressive treatment by stabilizing the mother with intravenous fluids and blood products in anticipation of early delivery has improved prognosis.

== Signs and symptoms ==
Acute fatty liver of pregnancy (or hepatic lipidosis of pregnancy) usually manifests in the third trimester of pregnancy, but may occur any time in the second half of pregnancy, or the puerperium, the period immediately after delivery. On average, the disease presents during the 35th or 36th week of pregnancy. The usual symptoms in the mother are non-specific including nausea, vomiting, anorexia (or lack of desire to eat) and abdominal pain; excessive thirst may be the earliest symptom without overlap with otherwise considered normal pregnancy symptoms; however, jaundice and fever may occur in as many as 70% of patients.

In patients with more severe disease, pre-eclampsia may occur, which involves elevation of blood pressure and accumulation of fluid (termed oedema). This may progress to involvement of additional systems, including acute kidney failure, hepatic encephalopathy, and pancreatitis. There have also been reports of diabetes insipidus complicating this condition.

Many laboratory abnormalities are seen in acute fatty liver of pregnancy. Liver enzymes are elevated, with the AST and ALT enzymes ranging from minimal elevation to 1000 IU/L, but usually staying in the 300-500 range. Bilirubin is almost universally elevated. Alkaline phosphatase is often elevated in pregnancy due to production from the placenta, but may be additionally elevated. Other abnormalities may include an elevated white blood cell count, hypoglycemia, elevated coagulation parameters, including the international normalized ratio, and decreased fibrinogen. Frank disseminated intravascular coagulation, or DIC, may occur in as many as 70% of people.

Abdominal ultrasound may show fat deposition in the liver, but, as the hallmark of this condition is microvesicular steatosis (see pathology below), this is not seen on ultrasound. Rarely, the condition can be complicated by rupture or necrosis of the liver, which may be identified by ultrasound.

== Pathophysiology ==
Schematic demonstrating mitochondrial fatty acid beta-oxidation and effects of LCHAD deficiency, a hallmark of acute fatty liver of pregnancy

The understanding of the causes of acute fatty liver of pregnancy has been improved by advances in mitochondrial biochemistry. Deficiency of LCHAD (3-hydroxyacyl-CoA dehydrogenase) leads to an accumulation of medium and long chain fatty acids. When this occurs in the foetus, the unmetabolized fatty acids will re-enter the maternal circulation through the placenta, and overwhelm the beta-oxidation enzymes of the mother. The gene responsible for LCHAD has been isolated, and the most common mutation found in acute fatty liver of pregnancy is the E474Q missense mutation. LCHAD deficiency is autosomal recessive in inheritance and mothers are often found to be heterozygous for the affected mutation.

== Diagnosis ==
The diagnosis of acute fatty liver of pregnancy is usually made on clinical grounds by the treating physician, but differentiation from other conditions affecting the liver may be difficult. The diagnosis of acute fatty liver of pregnancy is suggested by jaundice with a lesser elevation of liver enzymes, elevated white blood cell count, disseminated intravascular coagulation, and a clinically unwell patient.

A liver biopsy can provide a definitive diagnosis, but is not always done, due to the increased chance of bleeding in acute fatty liver of pregnancy. Often testing will be done to exclude more common conditions that present similarly, including viral hepatitis, pre-eclampsia, HELLP syndrome, intrahepatic cholestasis of pregnancy, and autoimmune hepatitis.

=== Pathology ===
If a liver biopsy is needed for diagnosis of the condition, the mother should be appropriately stabilized and treated to reduce bleeding-related complications. The diagnosis can be made by a frozen section (as opposed to a specimen in formalin) that is stained with the Oil red O stain, which shows microvesicular steatosis (or small collections of fat within the liver cells). The microvesicular steatosis usually spares zone one of the liver, which is the area closest to the hepatic artery. On the regular trichrome stain, the liver cell cytoplasm shows a foamy appearance due to the prominence of fat. Necrosis is rarely seen. The diagnosis can be enhanced by electron microscopy, which can be used to confirm the presence of microvesicular steatosis, and specifically the presence of megamitochondria and paracrystalline inclusions. Liver diseases with similar appearances include Reye's syndrome, drug-induced hepatitis from agents with mitochondrial toxicity, including nucleoside reverse transcriptase inhibitors used to treat HIV, and a rare condition known as Jamaican vomiting sickness which is caused by the eating of the unripened Ackee fruit.

== Treatment ==
Acute fatty liver of pregnancy is best treated in a centre with expertise in hepatology, high-risk obstetrics, maternal-fetal medicine, and neonatology. Physicians who treat this condition will often consult with experts in liver transplantation in severe cases. Admission to the intensive care unit is recommended.

Initial treatment involves supportive management with intravenous fluids, intravenous glucose, and blood products, including fresh frozen plasma and cryoprecipitate to correct DIC. The foetus should be monitored with cardiotocography. After the mother is stabilized, arrangements are usually made for delivery. This may occur vaginally, but, in cases of severe bleeding or compromise of the mother's status, a caesarian section may be needed. Often, AFLP is not diagnosed until the mother and baby are in trouble, so it is most likely that an emergency C-section is needed.

The complications of acute fatty liver of pregnancy may require treatment after delivery, especially if pancreatitis occurs. Liver transplantation is rarely required for treatment of the condition, but may be needed for mothers with severe DIC, those with rupture of the liver, or those with severe encephalopathy.

== Epidemiology ==
Acute fatty liver of pregnancy is a rare condition and occurs in approximately one in 7,000 to one in 15,000 pregnancies. The mortality from acute fatty liver of pregnancy has been reduced significantly to 18% and is now related primarily to complications, particularly DIC (Disseminated Intravascular Coagulation) and infections. After delivery, most mothers do well, as the stimulus for fatty acid overload is removed. The disease can recur in future pregnancies, with a calculated genetic chance of 25%; the actual rate is lower, however. Mortality of the foetus has also diminished significantly, but remains 23%, and may be related to the need for premature delivery.

== History ==
The disease was first described in 1940 by H. L. Sheehan as an "acute yellow atrophy" of the liver, then thought to be related to delayed chloroform poisoning.

== See also ==
- Fatty liver
