= 3-Methylglutaconic acid =

Names
- Preferred IUPAC name (2E)-3-Methylpent-2-enedioic acid
- Other names (E)-3-Methylglutaconic acid; 3-Methyl-2-pentenedioic acid

Identifiers
CAS Number	5746-90-7
3D model (JSmol)	Interactive image
ChEBI	CHEBI:37245
ChemSpider	1267861
MeSH	3-methylglutaconic+acid
PubChem CID	99884
UNII	F4N4BX780X
CompTox Dashboard (EPA)	DTXSID80863615
- InChI: InChI=1S/C6H8O4/c1-4(2-5(7)8)3-6(9)10/h2H,3H2,1H3,(H,7,8)(H,9,10)/b4-2+ Key: WKRBKYFIJPGYQC-DUXPYHPUSA-N; InChI=1/C6H8O4/c1-4(2-5(7)8)3-6(9)10/h2H,3H2,1H3,(H,7,8)(H,9,10)/b4-2+ Key: WKRBKYFIJPGYQC-DUXPYHPUBK
- SMILES: O=C(O)CC(=C\C(=O)O)\C

Properties
Chemical formula	C_{6}H_{8}O_{4}
Molar mass	144.126 g·mol^{−1}
- Except where otherwise noted, data are given for materials in their standard state (at 25 °C [77 °F], 100 kPa). verify (what is ?) Infobox references

3-Methylglutaconic acid is a dicarboxylic acid which builds up in the urine in 3-Methylglutaconic acidurias.

== See also ==
- Glutaconic acid
