= Cardiolipin =

- General chemical structure of cardiolipins, where R^{1}-R^{4} are variable fatty acid chains

Names
- IUPAC name 1,3-bis(sn-3’-phosphatidyl)-sn-glycerol

Identifiers
| 3D model (JSmol) | Interactive image |
| ChEBI | CHEBI:28494 |
| DrugBank | DB03429 specifically tetrastearoyl cardiolipin |
| KEGG | C05980 |
- SMILES: OC(COP(O)(=O)OC[C@@H](COC([*])=O)OC([*])=O)COP(O)(=O)OC[C@@H](COC([*])=O)OC([*])=O
- Except where otherwise noted, data are given for materials in their standard state (at 25 °C [77 °F], 100 kPa). Infobox references

Cardiolipin (IUPAC name 1,3-bis(sn-3’-phosphatidyl)-sn-glycerol, "sn" designating stereospecific numbering) is an important component of the inner mitochondrial membrane, where it constitutes about 20% of the total lipid composition. It can also be found in the membranes of most bacteria. The name "cardiolipin" is derived from the fact that it was first found in animal hearts. It was first isolated from the beef heart in the early 1940s by Mary C. Pangborn. In mammalian cells, but also in plant cells, cardiolipin (CL) is found almost exclusively in the inner mitochondrial membrane, where it is essential for the optimal function of numerous enzymes that are involved in mitochondrial energy metabolism.

== Structure ==
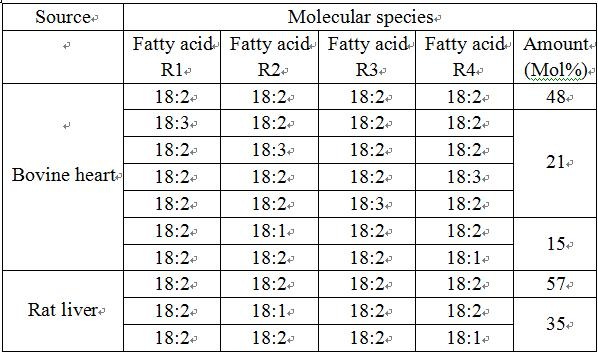
Cardiolipin in animal tissues

Cardiolipin (CL) is a kind of diphosphatidylglycerol lipid. Two phosphatidic acid moieties connect with a glycerol backbone in the center to form a dimeric structure. So it has four alkyl groups and potentially carries two negative charges. As there are four distinct alkyl chains in cardiolipin, the potential for complexity of this molecule species is enormous. However, in most animal tissues, cardiolipin contains 18-carbon fatty alkyl chains with 2 unsaturated bonds on each of them. It has been proposed that the (18:2)4 acyl chain configuration is an important structural requirement for the high affinity of CL to inner membrane proteins in mammalian mitochondria. However, studies with isolated enzyme preparations indicate that its importance may vary depending on the protein examined. In vitro experiments have shown that CL has high affinity for curved membrane regions.

Since there are two phosphates in the molecule, each of them can bond with one proton. Although it has a symmetric structure, ionizing one phosphate happens at a very different levels of acidity than ionizing both: pK_{1} = 3 and pK_{2} > 7.5. So under normal physiological conditions (wherein pH is around 7), the molecule may carry only one negative charge. The hydroxyl groups (–OH and –O^{−}) on phosphate would form a stable intramolecular hydrogen bond with the centered glycerol's hydroxyl group, thus forming a bicyclic resonance structure. This structure traps one proton, which is quite helpful for oxidative phosphorylation.

As the head group forms such compact bicycle structure, the head group area is quite small relative to the big tail region consisting of 4 acyl chains. Based on this special structure, the fluorescent mitochondrial indicator, nonyl acridine orange (NAO) was introduced in 1982, and was later found to target mitochondria by binding to CL. NAO has a very large head and small tail structure which can compensate with cardiolipin's small head and large tail structure, and arrange in a highly ordered way. Several studies were published utilizing NAO both as a quantitative mitochondrial indicator and an indicator of CL content in mitochondria. However, NAO is influenced by membrane potential and/or the spatial arrangement of CL, so it's not proper to use NAO for CL or mitochondria quantitative studies of intact respiring mitochondria. But NAO still represents a simple method of assessing CL content.

Cardiolipin bicyclic structure

Structure of NAO

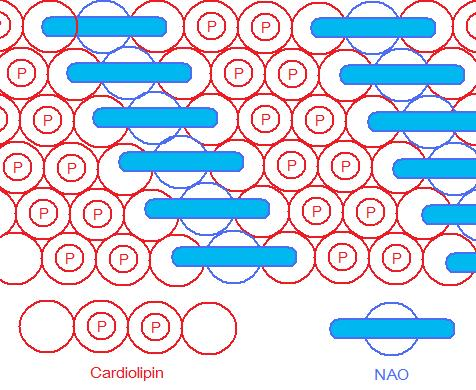
NAO & CL arranged in a highly ordered way

=== Methods to quantify and detect cardiolipin ===
The detection, quantification, and localisation of CL species is a valuable tool to investigate mitochondrial dysfunction and the pathophysiological mechanisms underpinning several human disorders. CL is measured using liquid chromatography, usually combined with mass spectrometry, mass spectrometry imaging, shotgun lipidomics, ion mobility spectrometry, fluorometry, and radiolabelling. Therefore, the choice of the analytical method depends on the experimental question, level of detail, and sensitivity required.

== Metabolism and catabolism ==
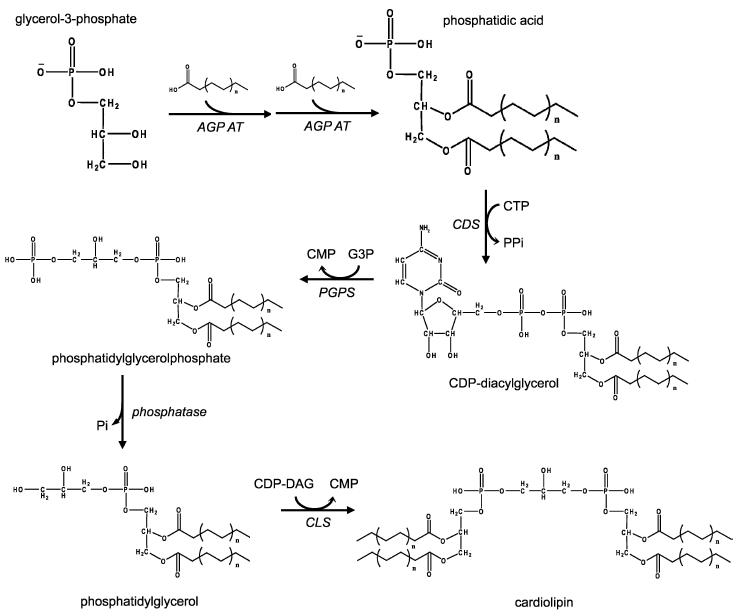
Cardiolipin synthesis in eukaryotes

=== Metabolism ===
==== Eukaryotic pathway ====
In eukaryotes such as yeasts, plants and animals, the synthesis processes are believed to happen in mitochondria. The first step is the acylation of glycerol-3-phosphate by a glycerol-3-phosphate acyltransferase. Then acylglycerol-3-phosphate can be once more acylated to form a phosphatidic acid (PA). With the help of the enzyme CDP-DAG synthase (CDS) (phosphatidate cytidylyltransferase), PA is converted into cytidinediphosphate-diacylglycerol (CDP-DAG). The following step is conversion of CDP-DAG to phosphatidylglycerol phosphate (PGP) by the enzyme PGP synthase, followed by dephosphorylation by PTPMT1 to form PG. Finally, a molecule of CDP-DAG is bound to PG to form one molecule of cardiolipin, catalyzed by the mitochondria-localized enzyme cardiolipin synthase (CLS).

==== Prokaryotic pathway ====
In prokaryotes such as bacteria, diphosphatidylglycerol synthase catalyses a transfer of the phosphatidyl moiety of one phosphatidylglycerol to the free 3'-hydroxyl group of another, with the elimination of one molecule of glycerol, via the action of an enzyme related to phospholipase D. The enzyme can operate in reverse under some physiological conditions to remove cardiolipin.

=== Catabolism ===
Catabolism of cardiolipin may happen by the catalysis of phospholipase A2 (PLA) to remove fatty acyl groups. Phospholipase D (PLD) in the mitochondrion hydrolyses cardiolipin to phosphatidic acid.

== Functions ==
=== Regulates aggregate structures ===
Respiratory electron transfer of Complex IV

Because of cardiolipin's unique structure, a change in pH and the presence of divalent cations can induce a structural change. CL shows a great variety of forms of aggregates. It is found that in the presence of Ca^{2+} or other divalent cations, CL can be induced to have a lamellar-to-hexagonal (L_{a}-H_{II}) phase transition. And it is believed to have a close connection with membrane fusion.

=== Facilitates the quaternary structure ===
The enzyme cytochrome c oxidase, also known as Complex IV, is a large transmembrane protein complex found in mitochondria and bacteria. It is the last enzyme in the respiratory electron transport chain located in the inner mitochondrial or bacterial membrane. It receives an electron from each of four cytochrome c molecules, and transfers them to one oxygen molecule, converting molecular oxygen to two molecules of water. Complex IV has been shown to require two associated CL molecules in order to maintain its full enzymatic function. Cytochrome bc1 (Complex III) also needs cardiolipin to maintain its quaternary structure and functional role. Complex V of the oxidative phosphorylation machinery also displays high binding affinity for CL, binding four molecules of CL per molecule of complex V.

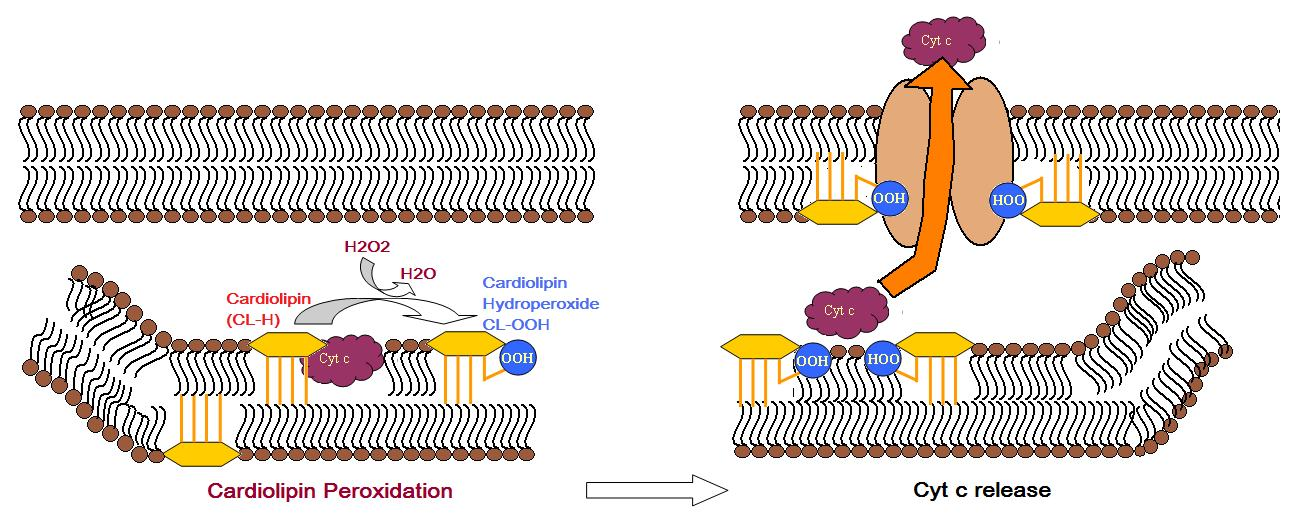
The mechanism whereby CL triggers apoptosis

=== Triggers apoptosis ===
Cardiolipin distribution to the outer mitochondrial membrane would lead to apoptosis of the cells, as evidenced by cytochrome c (cyt c) release, Caspase-8 activation, MOMP induction and NLRP3 inflammasome activation. During apoptosis, cyt c is released from the intermembrane spaces of mitochondria into the cytosol. Cyt c can then bind to the IP3 receptor on endoplasmic reticulum, stimulating calcium release, which then reacts back to cause the release of cyt c. When the calcium concentration reaches a toxic level, this causes cell death. Cytochrome c is thought to play a role in apoptosis via the release of apoptotic factors from the mitochondria. A cardiolipin-specific oxygenase produces CL hydroperoxides which can result in the conformation change of the lipid. The oxidized CL transfers from the inner membrane to the outer membrane, and then helps to form a permeable pore which releases cyt c.

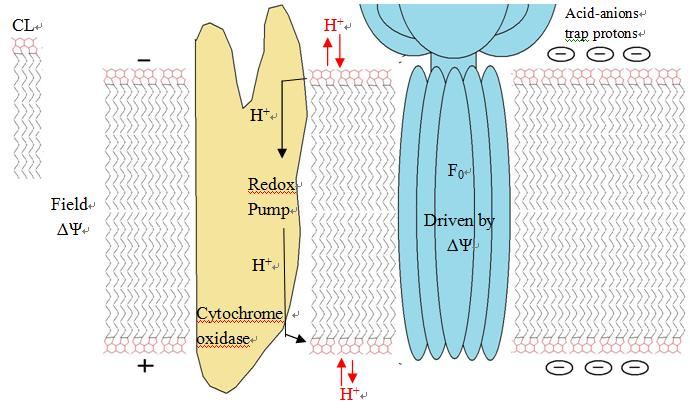
CL serves as a proton trap in oxidative phosphorylation

=== Serves as proton trap for oxidative phosphorylation ===
During the oxidative phosphorylation process catalyzed by Complex IV, large quantities of protons are transferred from one side of the membrane to another side causing a large pH change. CL is suggested to function as a proton trap within the mitochondrial membranes, thereby strictly localizing the proton pool and minimizing the changes in pH in the mitochondrial intermembrane space.

This function is due to CL's unique structure. As stated above, CL can trap a proton within the bicyclic structure while carrying a negative charge. Thus, this bicyclic structure can serve as an electron buffer pool to release or absorb protons to maintain the pH near the membranes.

=== Other functions ===
- Cholesterol translocation from outer to the inner mitochondrial membrane
- Activates mitochondrial cholesterol side-chain cleavage
- Import protein into mitochondrial matrix
- Anticoagulant function
- Modulates α-synuclein - malfunction of this process is thought to be a cause of Parkinson's disease.

== Clinical significance ==
Increasing evidence links aberrant CL metabolism and content to human disease. Human conditions include neurological disorders, cancer, and cardiovascular and metabolic disorders (a full list can be found at). As the number of human diseases with CL profile abnormalities has exponentially grown, the use of qualitative and quantitative diagnostics has emerged as a necessity.

=== Metabolic diseases ===
==== Barth syndrome ====
Barth syndrome is a rare genetic disorder that was recognised in the 1970s to cause infantile death. It has a mutation in the gene coding for tafazzin, an enzyme involved in the biosynthesis of cardiolipin. Tafazzin is an indispensable enzyme to synthesize cardiolipin in eukaryotes involved in the remodeling of CL acyl chains by transferring linoleic acid from PC to monolysocardiolipin. Mutation of tafazzin would cause insufficient cardiolipin remodeling. However, it appears that cells compensate and ATP production is similar or higher than normal cells. Females heterozygous for the trait are unaffected. Sufferers of this condition have mitochondria that are abnormal. Cardiomyopathy and general weakness is common to these patients.

==== Combined malonic and methylmalonic aciduria (CMAMMA) ====
In the metabolic disease combined malonic and methylmalonic aciduria (CMAMMA) due to ACSF3 deficiency, there is an altered composition of complex lipids as a result of impaired mitochondrial fatty acid synthesis (mtFAS), so for example the content of cardiolipins is strongly increased.

==== Tangier disease ====
Tangier disease is also linked to CL abnormalities. Tangier disease is characterized by very low blood plasma levels of HDL cholesterol, accumulation of cholesteryl esters in tissues, and an increased risk for developing cardiovascular disease. Unlike Barth syndrome, Tangier disease is mainly caused by abnormal enhanced production of CL. Studies show that there are three to fivefold increase of CL level in Tangier disease. Because increased CL levels would enhance cholesterol oxidation, and then the formation of oxysterols would consequently increase cholesterol efflux. This process could function as an escape mechanism to remove excess cholesterol from the cell.

=== Parkinson's disease and Alzheimer's disease ===
Oxidative stress and lipid peroxidation are believed to be contributing factors leading to neuronal loss and mitochondrial dysfunction in the substantia nigra in Parkinson's disease, and may play an early role in the pathogenesis of Alzheimer's disease. It is reported that CL content in the brain decreases with aging, and a recent study on rat brain shows it results from lipid peroxidation in mitochondria exposed to free radical stress. Another study shows that the CL biosynthesis pathway may be selectively impaired, causing 20% reduction and composition change of the CL content. It is also associated with a 15% reduction in linked complex I/III activity of the electron transport chain, which is thought to be a critical factor in the development of Parkinson's disease.

=== Nonalcoholic fatty liver disease and heart failure ===
Recently, it is reported that in metabolic dysfunction–associated steatotic liver disease and heart failure, decreased CL levels and change in acyl chain composition are also observed in the mitochondrial dysfunction. However, the role of CL in aging and ischemia/reperfusion is still controversial.

=== Diabetes ===
Heart disease is twice as common in people with diabetes. In diabetics, cardiovascular complications occur at an earlier age and often result in premature death, making heart disease the major killer of diabetic people. Cardiolipin has been found to be deficient in the heart at the earliest stages of diabetes, possibly due to a lipid-digesting enzyme that becomes more active in diabetic heart muscle.

=== Syphilis ===
Cardiolipin from a cow heart is used as an antigen in the Wassermann test for syphilis. Anti-cardiolipin antibodies can also be increased in numerous other conditions, including systemic lupus erythematosus, malaria and tuberculosis, so this test is not specific.

=== HIV-1 ===
Human immunodeficiency virus-1 (HIV-1) has infected more than 60 million people worldwide. HIV-1 envelope glycoprotein contains at least four sites for neutralizing antibodies. Among these sites, the membrane-proximal region (MPR) is particularly attractive as an antibody target because it facilitates viral entry into T cells and is highly conserved among viral strains. However, it is found that two antibodies directed against 2F5, 4E10 in MPR react with self-antigens, including cardiolipin. Thus, it's difficult for such antibodies to be elicited by vaccination.

=== Cancer ===
It was first proposed by Otto Heinrich Warburg that cancer originated from irreversible injury to mitochondrial respiration, but the structural basis for this injury has remained elusive. Since cardiolipin is an important phospholipid found almost exclusively in the inner mitochondrial membrane and very essential in maintaining mitochondrial function, it is suggested that abnormalities in CL can impair mitochondrial function and bioenergetics. A study published in 2008 on mouse brain tumors supporting Warburg's cancer theory shows major abnormalities in CL content or composition in all tumors.

=== Antiphospholipid syndrome ===
Patients with anti-cardiolipin antibodies (Antiphospholipid syndrome) can have recurrent thrombotic events even early in their mid- to late-teen years. These events can occur in vessels in which thrombosis may be relatively uncommon, such as the hepatic or renal veins. These antibodies are usually picked up in young women with recurrent spontaneous abortions. In anti-cardiolipin-mediated autoimmune disease, there is a dependency on the apolipoprotein H for recognition.

=== Additional anti-cardiolipin diseases ===
==== Chronic fatigue syndrome ====
Chronic fatigue syndrome is debilitating illness of unknown cause that often follows an acute viral infection. According to one research study, 95% of CFS patients have anti-cardiolipin antibodies.

== See also ==
- Phosphatidylglycerol
