= LYRM protein =

Protein superfamily

LYRM proteins
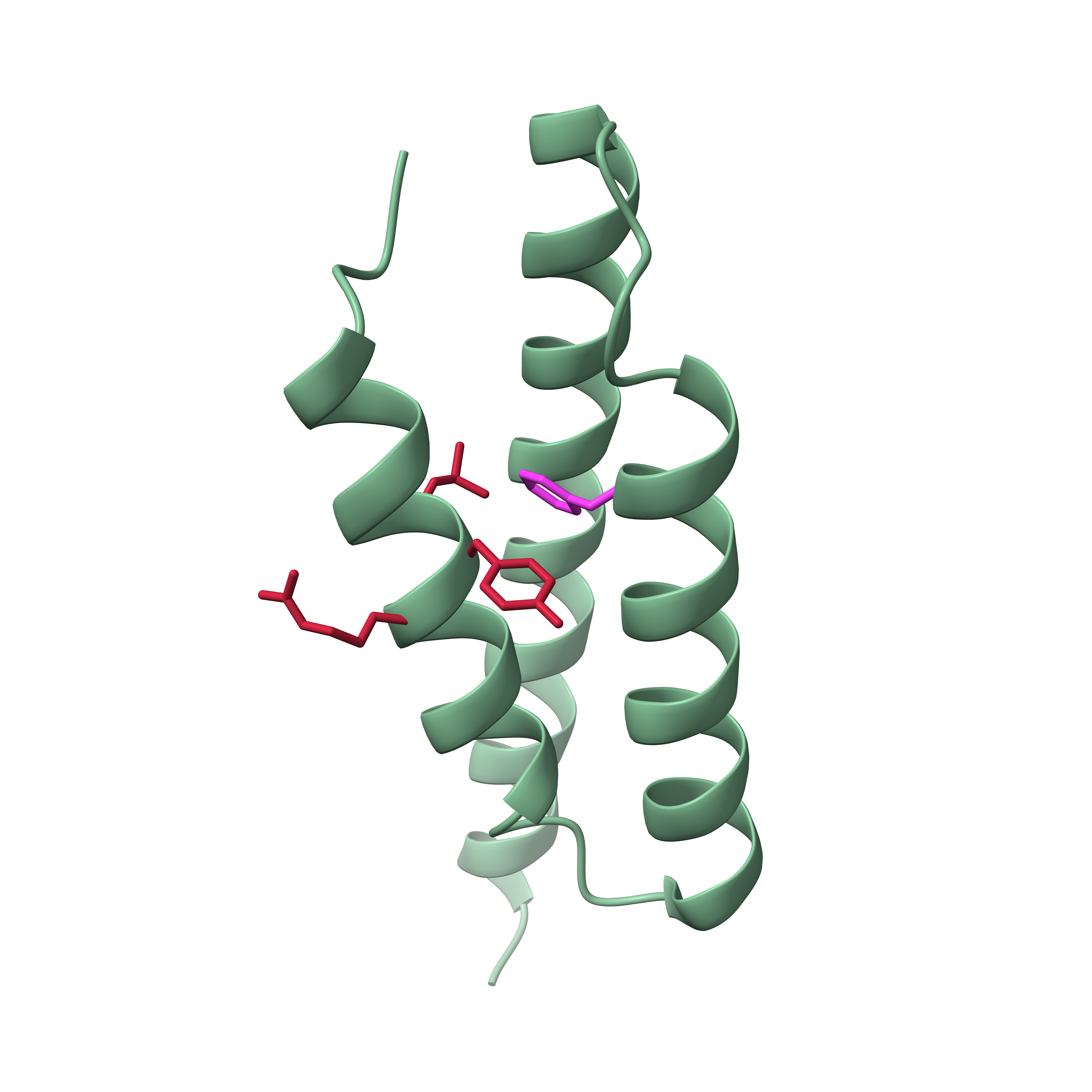
- Example of a LYRM protein (human LYRM4/ISD11) highlighting the conserved LYR motif (red) and conserved phenylalanine residue (magenta) of the three-α-helix bundle.

Identifiers
- Symbol: LYR-like
- Pfam clan: CL0491

LYRM protein (Leucine-Tyrosine-Arginine motif) also known as LYRMs, are a superfamily of small (11–22 kDa), basic, predominantly mitochondrial proteins found exclusively in eukaryotes and named after their conserved LYR-like motif near the N-terminus. They function as accessory subunits or assembly factors of OXPHOS complexes I, II, III and V and play essential roles in iron–sulfur (Fe–S) cluster biogenesis, mitochondrial translation, electron transfer flavoprotein (ETF) function, and acetate metabolism. Most LYRM proteins depend on mitochondrial fatty acid synthesis (mtFAS) for their function, as they are allosterically activated by binding to acylated mitochondrial acyl carrier protein (acyl-mtACP). It has been proposed that this mechanism evolved to protect cells from the toxic interaction of iron and oxygen.

== Species distribution ==
LYRM proteins are found exclusively in eukaryotes, but they differ between species. While LYRM proteins have been lost in anaerobic eukaryotes or are retained only in the form of LYRM4, twelve LYRM proteins occur in humans.

== Human paralogs ==
At least 12 LYRM proteins have been identified in humans (2019):

Human LYRM paralogs
LYRM protein	Gene	LYR-like motif	m (kDa)	pI	Target location	Function	Interaction partner
LYRM1	LYRM1	LYR	14	10	Mitoribosome (predicted)	Insulin signaling	Acyl-mtACP, MTRF1L (predicted)
LYRM2	LYRM2	LYR	11	11	Complex I	Associates with Complex I activity	Acyl-mtACP
LYRM3	NDUFB9	LYK	22	9	Complex I	Structural subunit	Acyl-mtACP
LYRM4	LYRM4/ISD11	LYR	11	11	Cysteine desulfurase NFS1	Iron-sulfur cluster biogenesis	Acyl-mtACP, NFS1
LYRM5	ETFRF1	LYK	11	10	Electron transfer flavoprotein (ETF)	Accessory factor	Acyl-mtACP
LYRM6	NDUFA6	LYR	18	10	Complex I	Structural subunit	Acyl-mtACP, NDUFS3
LYRM7	LYRM7/MZM1L	LFK	12	10	Complex III	Assembly factor	Acyl-mtACP, UQCRFS1, HSC20
LYRM8	SDHAF1	LYR	13	11	Complex II	Assembly factor	Acyl-mtACP, SDHB, HSC20
LYRM9	LYRM9/C17orf108	LYR	10	9	Mitoribosome (predicted)	Unknown	Acyl-mtACP, MRPL57 (predicted)
LYRM10	LYRM10/ACN9/SDHAF3	LYK	15	9	Complex II	Assembly factor	Acyl-mtACP, SDHB
FMC1	FMC1/C7orf55	TFR	13	10	Complex V	Assembly factor	Unacylated holo-mtACP, ATP12
L0R8F8	MIEF1 / AltMiD51 / MIEF1-MP				Mitoribosome	Assembly factor	Unacylated holo-mtACP

== Subcellular distribution ==
With the exception of LYRM3 and LYRM6, which are embedded within mitochondrial Complex I, LYRM proteins are soluble matrix-located proteins.

They are synthesized in the cytosol by ribosomes after being transcribed from nuclear DNA, and are then imported into the mitochondria. Some members have also been identified in the cytosol and nucleus.

== Structure ==
LYRM proteins constitute a conserved family of small mitochondrial proteins defined by sequence homology to the Complex1_LYR-like superfamily (Pfam clan CL0491, which was identified by bioinformatic analysis and curated by P. Coggill (EMBL-EBI). The family was originally defined based on LYRM4, which stabilizes the cysteine desulfurase NFS1 within the mitochondrial iron–sulfur cluster (ISC) assembly machinery. The presence of an LYR tripeptide alone is not sufficient to classify a protein as an LYRM, as additional conserved amino acid residues must also be present. Members of this family share the following characteristic features:

- Sequence features:
  - a conserved LYR-like motif near the N-terminus (e.g. LYR, LYK, LFK, TFR),
  - additional conserved amino acid residues downstream of the motif:
    - basic residues, particularly arginine (R) and lysine (K),
    - a highly conserved phenylalanine (F) residue,
    - in some subfamilies, additional residues including tyrosine (Y) and glycine (G) at the C-terminus,
- Structural features:
  - structural homology characterized by a conserved three-α-helix bundle,
  - a hydrophobic channel formed by the three-α-helix bundle, accommodating the fatty acyl chain of acylated mtACP (except FMC1),
- General properties:
  - a small protein size (11–22 kDa),
  - a basic isoelectric point (pI ≈ 9–11),

== Function ==
The family was originally defined based on LYRM4, which stabilizes the cysteine desulfurase NFS1 within the mitochondrial iron–sulfur cluster (ISC) assembly machinery. All LYRM proteins have in common that they are found in mitochondrial target complexes that contain iron–sulfur clusters, synthesize them, or are functionally linked to them, such as the electron transfer protein and the mitochondrial ribosome. The only exception is FMC1, which acts at a target complex lacking iron–sulfur clusters, complex V, although this complex has been linked to mitochondrial iron uptake.

These features distinguish LYRM proteins from the broader term "LYR proteins", which has been used by some authors in the past for proteins that contain an LYR tripeptide—a motif frequently found in mitochondrial proteins such as SDHB, NDUFAF3, or mitochondrial ribosomal proteins—but that lack the additional defining characteristics of the LYRM family.

=== Iron–sulfur cluster biogensis ===
In eukaryotes, iron–sulfur (Fe–S) clusters serve as versatile cofactors in redox reactions, electron transport, enzyme catalysis, regulation of gene expression, and DNA repair. They are assembled on the ISCU scaffold protein, with iron donated by frataxin and sulfur provided by the NFS1–LYRM4 complex. This complex binds acyl-mtACP via LYRM4, and this interaction stabilizes the otherwise degradation-prone complex. Once formed, Fe–S clusters are transferred to target proteins by a Fe–S transfer complex composed of ISCU, the co-chaperone HSC20, and the chaperone HSPA9.

The incorporation of iron–sulfur clusters into OXPHOS complexes II and III with the help of other LYRM proteins is covered below under "OXPHOS complex assembly".

=== OXPHOS complex assembly ===
The assembly of these complexes depends on a tightly regulated and coordinated process involving transcription and translation of both nuclear- and mitochondrial-encoded subunits, import and assembly of individual subunits, and maturation through the insertion of essential cofactors such as iron–sulfur clusters. OXPHOS complexes can further assemble into higher-order structures known as supercomplexes, whose formation and stability are influenced by interactions between acylated mtACP and LYRM proteins.

==== Complex I (NADH:ubiquinone oxidoreductase) ====
Three LYRM proteins—LYRM3, LYRM6, and LYRM2—are known to be associated with Complex I. The first complex of the respiratory chain couples NADH oxidation and ubiquinone reduction to proton pumping across the inner mitochondrial membrane and constitutes the largest single contributor to the proton motive force driving ATP synthesis. Under certain conditions, the reaction can reverse, resulting in the reduction of NAD^{+}.

LYRM3 is an integral accessory subunit of Complex I, positioned in the distal proton-translocating module P_{D} of the membrane arm. It forms a stable heterodimer with the neighboring mtACP, contributing to the stability and assembly of Complex I.

LYRM6 is also an integral accessory subunit of Complex I. It binds near the critical interface between the matrix arm (Q module) and the membrane arm (P module) of Complex I, forming a heterodimer with mtACP. Two adjacent loops of LYRM6 interact directly with central subunits of Complex I, helping stabilize this interface. In particular, LYRM6 plays a key role in stabilizing the TMH1-2 loop of subunit ND3, a structural element essential for the proton pumping mechanism.

LYRM2 is located in mitochondria, directly interacts with Complex I and increases its activity.

==== Complex II (Succinate dehydrogenase) ====
LYRM8 and ACN9 are required for the assembly of the Fe–S cluster–containing subunit SDHB in Complex II. As part of the citric acid cycle, Complex II couples the oxidation of succinate to fumarate to the reduction of ubiquinone. The functions of LYRM8 and ACN9 involve interactions with acyl-mtACP.

LYRM8 functions as an assembly factor for Complex II, acting as a bridge between HSC20, as part of the Fe–S cluster transfer complex, and the SDHB subunit. As one of four subunits of Complex II, SDHB plays a central role in transferring electrons from subunit SDHA to ubiquinone via its three iron–sulfur clusters. HSC20 recognizes and binds with high affinity to LYR motifs; however, SDHB itself contains only two L(I)YR motifs, an IYR motif near the N-terminus and a LYR motif closer to the C-terminus. However, SDHB is not one of the LYRM proteins. Additionally, several aromatic amino acid regions within SDHB enable the transient binding of a LYRM8 protein through its arginine-rich C-terminal domain, thereby providing a LYRM site for HSC20 and thus contributing to Fe–S cluster incorporation into SDHB. Notably, LYRM8 itself also contains two LYR motifs, located at the N-terminus and in the central region, but HSC20 binds exclusively to the N-terminal motif.

ACN9 functions as an assembly factor involved in the maturation of Complex II. Specifically, it contributes to the incorporation of iron–sulfur (Fe–S) clusters into the SDHB subunit, which is essential for Complex II activity. However, its exact molecular role remains to be fully defined. Yeast data indicate that ACN9 plays a role in gluconeogenesis and in converting ethanol or acetate into carbohydrates.

==== Complex III (Coenzyme Q : cytochrome c – oxidoreductase) ====
LYRM7 functions as an assembly factor for Complex III, acting as a chaperone for the Rieske iron-sulfur protein. Complex III's task is to transfer electrons from the two-electron carrier ubiquinone to the one-electron carrier cytochrome c via the Q cycle, while pumping protons to build a gradient. It functions as a dimer (CIII_{2}), with each monomer composed of 11 subunits. Among these, three are catalytic: cytochrome b, cytochrome c1, and the Rieske iron-sulfur protein, which contains a [2Fe–2S] cluster (Rieske center). During the assembly process, a stable but non-functional "late core" pre-Complex III forms, containing all subunits except the Rieske iron-sulfur protein and subunit Qcr10. To complete the assembly, LYRM7 binds to and stabilizes the Rieske iron-sulfur protein in the mitochondrial matrix before its translocation to the inner membrane and subsequent integration into the pre-complex. This prevents the Rieske iron-sulfur protein from proteolytic degradation or temperature‑induced aggregation. Final incorporation of both the Rieske iron-sulfur protein and Qcr10 into pre-Complex III is then driven by the AAA-ATPase BCS1L, completing the assembly of complex III.

==== Complex V (ATP synthase) ====
FMC1 acts as an assembly factor for Complex V by stabilizing ATP12, a chaperone required for proper F_{1} assembly, particularly under elevated temperatures. Complex V synthesizes ATP from ADP and inorganic phosphate by harnessing the proton motive force generated by the electron transport chain through a rotary catalytic mechanism. It consists of an Fo domain embedded in the inner mitochondrial membrane that translocates protons, and a matrix-exposed F₁ domain where ATP synthesis occurs. Within the F₁ domain, the catalytic hexameric ring of alternating α- and β-subunits requires ATP12 for assembly, with FMC1 supporting ATP12 at elevated temperatures; without this, subunits are not incorporated properly and aggregate in the mitochondrial matrix. Although FMC1 belongs to the LYRM protein family, its function is independent of acylated mtACP, consistent with the absence of key residues of the LYR motif and a channel formed by its three α-helices that is not sufficiently hydrophobic. Nevertheless, FMC1interacts with unacylated mtACP, enabling F_{1} domain assembly even when acetyl-CoA is limited. This ensures that Complex V remains functional during metabolic stress, allowing it to operate in reverse and hydrolyze ATP to maintain the proton gradient required for protein import and other transport processes.

=== Electron transfer flavoprotein function ===
LYRM5 interacts with the two subunits ETFA and ETFB of electron transfer flavoprotein (ETF), which destabilizes the FAD binding site, leading to the release of FAD and thereby to an interruption of normal electron transfer. ETF functions as an electron carrier, transiently docking with mitochondrial flavoproteins involved in fatty acid and amino acid oxidation (e.g., acyl-CoA dehydrogenases, isovaleryl-CoA dehydrogenase), accepting electrons as its own FAD is reduced to FADH_{2}. The reduced ETF then dissociates and transfers the electrons to ETF:ubiquinone oxidoreductase (ETF:QO), an enzyme embedded in the inner mitochondrial membrane that also contains FAD. ETF:QO is thereby reduced and passes the electrons to ubiquinone (CoQ10) in the respiratory chain. Unlike other LYRM family members, LYRM5 lacks the characteristic leucine–tyrosine–arginine motif and instead contains a leucine–tyrosine–lysine motif.

=== Mitoribosome assembly ===
The LYRM protein L0R8F8 and mtACP function as assembly factors for the human mitoribosome. Mitoribosomes translate mitochondrial mRNAs into 13 specific proteins, which are exclusively incorporated as structural subunits into Complexes I, III, IV, and V of the mitochondrial respiratory chain. In the late stages of human mitoribosome large subunit (mt-LSU) maturation, a complex composed of MALSU1, L0R8F8, and mtACP associates with the mt-LSU. This complex sterically prevents premature association with the small subunit (mt-SSU), thereby regulating the timing of mitoribosome subunit joining. Structural analyses have shown that the interaction between L0R8F8 and mtACP is mediated by the LYR motif of L0R8F8 and the 4'-phosphopantetheine moiety of mtACP. Notably, in this context, mtACP is found in its unacylated form holo-mtACP, and no acyl chain density is observed in the structural data.

=== Mitochondrial acyl carrier protein interaction ===
Human LYRM4/ISD11 (green, LYR motif in red, phenylalanine residue in magenta) in complex with the cysteine desulfurase NFS1 (gray) and acylated E. coli acyl carrier protein (acyl-ACP; protein in dark blue, 4'-phosphopantetheine group in light blue, and C12 fatty acyl chain in yellow). The three-α-helix bundle of LYRM4 forms a hydrophobic channel in which the ACP-bound fatty acyl chain is embedded. This interaction stabilizes NFS1 within the mitochondrial iron–sulfur cluster assembly machinery.

With the exception of FMC1, the function of LYRM proteins depends on their interaction with acylated mitochondrial acyl carrier protein (acyl-mtACP), which inserts its fatty acyl chain into a hydrophobic channel of the LYRM protein formed by three α-helices. Upon binding, the fatty acyl chain attached to the flexible 4'-phosphopantetheine arm of mtACP flips from its hydrophobic cavity into that of the LYRM protein. This interaction also requires the LYR-like motif and the highly conserved downstream phenylalanine residue, collectively referred to as the LYR–F motif. While LYRM proteins can interact with 4'-phosphopantetheine-modified mtACP (holo-mtACP) in both its unacylated and acylated form, they exhibit a clear preference and higher affinity for the acylated form. The acylated form of holo-mtACP is generated by mitochondrial fatty acid synthesis (mtFAS) in response to acetyl-CoA availability. Fatty acyl chains of 10–16 carbons in length are required for effective binding to LYRM proteins.

Acylation of mtACP is an acetyl-CoA-dependent post-translational modification that is sensitive to perturbations in mitochondrial acetyl-CoA synthesis and allosterically activates those LYRM proteins that function as assembly factors for OXPHOS complexes. It is proposed that this mechanism forms a feedback loop in which acetyl-CoA availability regulates mtACP acylation and LYRM-mediated OXPHOS assembly, thereby increasing NADH and FADH_{2} oxidation and citric acid cycle activity, which in turn promotes acetyl-CoA consumption. This would allow cells to increase oxidative capacity when substrate is abundant while preventing electron transport chain activity under substrate-limited conditions, thereby reducing reactive oxygen species (ROS) formation.

In addition to their role in OXPHOS assembly, mtACP and LYRM proteins have also been implicated in mitochondrial translation. Although the role of mtFAS in mammalian mitoribosome assembly and mitochondrial translation has not been experimentally studied, structural analyses revealed the LYRM protein L0R8F8 and unacylated mtACP bound to the mitoribosomal assembly factor MALSU1. This finding suggests a distinct mtACP–LYRM binding mode in which mtACP acylation may promote release of the complex, allowing mitoribosome assembly to proceed. Furthermore, LYRM1 is predicted to interact with the mitochondrial translational release factor 1-like (MTRF1L), while LYRM9 is predicted to interact with mitochondrial ribosomal protein L57 (MRPL57).

== Clinical significance ==
Defects in human LYRMs, due to their critical role in mitochondrial function, have been linked to severe diseases:

- mitochondrial enoyl-CoA reductase protein-associated neurodegeneration (MEPAN; mtFAS defect)
- apoptosis in HIV-1 infection (LYRM6)
- deficiency of multiple OXPHOS complexes (LYRM4)
- encephalopathy (LYRM7)
- genetic predisposition to alcohol dependence (ACN9)
- infantile leukoencephalopathy (LYRM8)
- insulin resistance (LYRM1)
- lactic acidosis (LYRM7)
- muscular hypotonia (LYRM3)
- various mitochondrial disorders (LYRM3)
