= Mitochondrial acyl carrier protein =

Protein-coding gene in the species Homo sapiens

NDUFAB1

Identifiers
- Aliases: NDUFAB1, ACP, FASN2A, SDAP, NADH:ubiquinone oxidoreductase subunit AB1, ACP1, ACPM
- External IDs: OMIM: 603836; MGI: 4936891; GeneCards: NDUFAB1
Available structures
PDB	Human UniProt search: PDBe RCSB
PDB	List of PDB id codes 2DNW

Gene location (Human)
Chr.	Chromosome 16 (human)
Band	16p12.2	Start	23,581,014 bp
Band	16p12.2	End	23,596,316 bp
RNA expression pattern
Bgee	Human / Mouse (ortholog); Top expressed in: right ventricle; myocardium of left ventricle; apex of heart; biceps brachii; atrium; right auricle of heart; body of tongue; Skeletal muscle tissue of biceps brachii; triceps brachii muscle; vastus lateralis muscle / n/a; More reference expression data
BioGPS	n/a
Gene ontology
Molecular function	calcium ion binding; NADH dehydrogenase (ubiquinone) activity; fatty acid binding; acyl binding; acyl carrier activity; protein binding; phosphopantetheine binding
Cellular component	mitochondrial membranes; mitochondrial respiratory chain complex I; mitochondrial matrix; mitochondrial inner membrane; respirasome; nucleoplasm; mitochondrion; cytosol; mitochondrial large ribosomal subunit
Biological process	lipid metabolism; fatty acid metabolic process; fatty acid biosynthetic process; protein lipoylation; lipid A biosynthetic process; mitochondrial respiratory chain complex I assembly; mitochondrial electron transport, NADH to ubiquinone
Sources:Amigo / QuickGO
Orthologs
Databases	NCBI: entry; OMA: entry
Species	Human	Mouse
Entrez	4706	102634451
Ensembl	ENSG00000004779	ENSMUSG00000091989
UniProt	O14561	n/a
RefSeq (mRNA)	NM_005003	XM_036153610
RefSeq (protein)	NP_004994	n/a
Location (UCSC)	Chr 16: 23.58 – 23.6 Mb	n/a
PubMed search
- Wikidata
View/Edit Human	View/Edit Mouse

Mitochondrial acyl carrier protein (mtACP), also known as NADH:ubiquinone oxidoreductase subunit AB1 (NDUFAB1), is a protein encoded by the human NDUFAB1 gene. As a soluble matrix protein, it functions as a scaffold on which mitochondrial fatty acid synthesis (mtFAS) builds de novo fatty acyl chains. The octanoyl (C8) form of mtACP provides the precursor for mitochondrial lipoic acid biosynthesis, and protein–protein interactions between mtACP and LYRM proteins are required for central mitochondrial processes, including the assembly of respiratory chain complexes, iron–sulfur cluster biogenesis, and mitochondrial ribosome assembly. Through its binding to the complex I subunits LYRM3 and LYRM6, acyl-mtACP is incorporated as a structural component of complex I, giving rise to its designation as NDUFAB1.

mtFAS-derived acyl-mtACP and its interactions with LYRM proteins have been hypothesized to form a feedback loop that allows acetyl-CoA to regulate its own consumption through the assembly of respiratory chain complexes, which in turn controls citric acid cycle flux.

== Structure ==
The NDUFAB1 gene is located on the p arm of chromosome 16 at position 12.2 and it spans 15,327 base pairs. The NDUFAB1 gene produces a 17.4 kDa protein composed of 156 amino acids. NDUFAB1 is a subunit of the enzyme NADH dehydrogenase (ubiquinone), the largest of the respiratory complexes. The structure is L-shaped with a long, hydrophobic transmembrane domain and a hydrophilic domain for the peripheral arm that includes all the known redox centers and the NADH binding site. NDUFAB1 is one of about 31 hydrophobic subunits that form the transmembrane region of Complex I. It has been noted that the N-terminal hydrophobic domain has the potential to be folded into an alpha helix spanning the inner mitochondrial membrane with a C-terminal hydrophilic domain interacting with globular subunits of Complex I. The highly conserved two-domain structure suggests that this feature is critical for the protein function and that the hydrophobic domain acts as an anchor for the NADH dehydrogenase (ubiquinone) complex at the inner mitochondrial membrane.

== Function ==
mtACP exists in apo, holo, and acylated forms with distinct biological functions:

Form		Explanation	Functional status	Biological role
Unacylated mtACP	apo-mtACP	Protein lacking post-translational phosphopantetheinylation.	Inactive	Inactive precursor
Unacylated mtACP	holo-mtACP	apo-mtACP modified by phosphopantetheinylation catalyzed by AASDHPPT at a conserved serine residue, thereby carrying a 4'-phosphopantetheine (4'-PP) arm.	Bioactive	Scaffold on which mitochondrial fatty acid synthesis (mtFAS) builds the fatty acyl chain; Interaction with the LYRM protein L0R8F8, which stabilizes the mitoribosome assembly factor MALSU1; Interaction with the LYRM protein FMC1 required for assembly of complex V
Acyl-mtACP		holo-mtACP modified by mtFAS, thereby carrying a fatty acyl chain (C2-C16) attached via the thiol group of the 4'-phosphopantetheine arm. Compared with holo-mtACP, the fatty acyl chain increases binding affinity through additional hydrophobic interactions, making acyl-mtACP the most bioactive state.	Bioactive	Octanoyl-mtACP (C8) is a precursor for lipoic acid biosynthesis; Interaction with multiple LYRM proteins required for the assembly of respiratory chain complexes I, II, and III; Interaction with the complex I subunits LYRM3 and LYRM6, enabling acyl-mtACP to become an integral part of complex I; Interaction with LYRM4, which is required for the activity of the cysteine desulfurase NFS1 in early iron–sulfur cluster biogenesis; Interaction with LYRM5 associated with the electron transfer flavoprotein

The human NDUFAB1 gene codes for a subunit of Complex I of the respiratory chain, which transfers electrons from NADH to ubiquinone. However, NDUFAB1 is an accessory subunit of the complex that is believed not to be involved in catalysis. Initially, NADH binds to Complex I and transfers two electrons to the isoalloxazine ring of the flavin mononucleotide (FMN) prosthetic arm to form FMNH_{2}. The electrons are transferred through a series of iron-sulfur (Fe-S) clusters in the prosthetic arm and finally to coenzyme Q10 (CoQ), which is reduced to ubiquinol (CoQH_{2}). The flow of electrons changes the redox state of the protein, resulting in a conformational change and pK shift of the ionizable side chain, which pumps four hydrogen ions out of the mitochondrial matrix.

== Clinical Significance ==
In a genome-wide association study (GWAS) meta-analysis conducted across European and African American populations, the NDUFAB1 gene and two other genes (MFAP3L and PALB2) were identified as genetic loci significantly associated with anxiety disorders (ADs). Since the comorbidity of ADs arises from their shared genetic basis, these candidate genetic loci may become therapeutic targets for AD treatments. Moreover, a study to identify small molecule drug targets for Tetralogy of Fallot (TOF), a congenital malformation of the heart, found the NDUFAB1 gene to be a major hub gene of differentially expressed genes in TOF.
