= Frataxin-like domain =

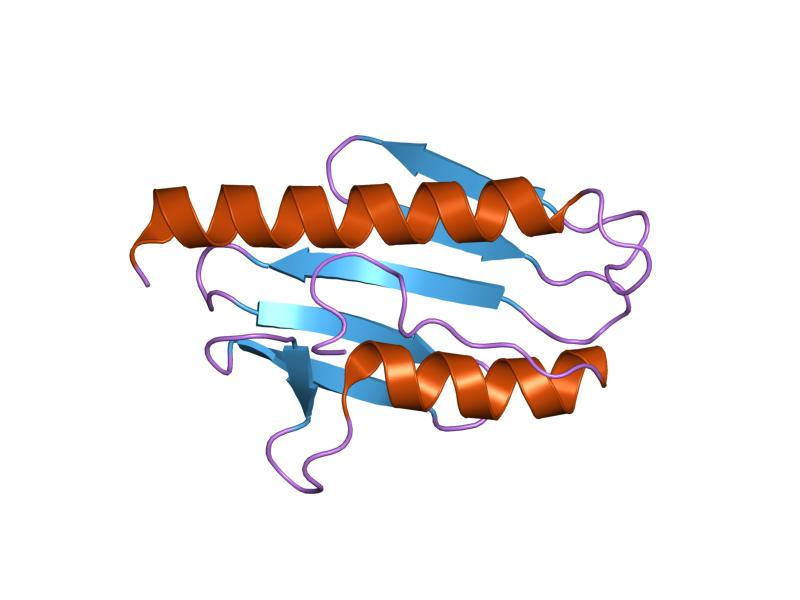
- mature human frataxin

Identifiers
- Symbol: Frataxin_Cyay
- Pfam: PF01491
- InterPro: IPR002908
- SCOP2: 1dlx / SCOPe / SUPFAM
- TCDB: 9.B.21
- CDD: cd00503
Available protein structures:
- Pfam: structures / ECOD
- PDB: RCSB PDB; PDBe; PDBj
- PDBsum: structure summary

In molecular biology, the frataxin-like domain is a protein domain found in proteins including eukaryotic frataxin and bacterial CyaY.

The bacterial CyaY proteins are iron-sulphur cluster (FeS) metabolism proteins which are homologous to eukaryotic frataxin. Partial phylogenetic profiling suggests that CyaY most likely functions as part of the ISC system for FeS cluster biosynthesis, and is supported by experimental data in some species.
