= Mitochondrial matrix =

Space within the inner membrane of the mitochondrion

Cell biology
- mitochondrion
- Components of a typical mitochondrion 1 Outer membrane 1.1 Porin 2 Intermembrane space 2.1 Intracristal space 2.2 Peripheral space 3 Lamella 3.1 Inner membrane 3.11 Inner boundary membrane 3.12 Cristal membrane 3.2 Matrix ◄ You are here 3.3 Cristae 4 Mitochondrial DNA; 5 Matrix granule 6 Mitochondrial ribosome 7 ATP synthase

In a mitochondrion, the matrix is the space within the inner membrane. It can also be referred as the mitochondrial fluid. The word "matrix" stems from the fact that this space is viscous, compared to the relatively aqueous cytoplasm. The mitochondrial matrix contains the mitochondrial DNA, ribosomes, soluble enzymes, small organic molecules, nucleotide cofactors, and inorganic ions.^{[1]} The enzymes in the matrix facilitate reactions responsible for the production of ATP, such as the citric acid cycle, oxidative phosphorylation, oxidation of pyruvate, and the beta oxidation of fatty acids.

The composition of the matrix based on its structures and contents produce an environment that allows the anabolic and catabolic pathways to proceed favorably. The electron transport chain and enzymes in the matrix play a large role in the citric acid cycle and oxidative phosphorylation. The citric acid cycle produces NADH and FADH2 through oxidation that will be reduced in oxidative phosphorylation to produce ATP.

The cytosolic, intermembrane space, compartment has a higher aqueous:protein content of around 3.8 μL/mg protein relative to that occurring in mitochondrial matrix where such levels typically are near 0.8 μL/mg protein. It is not known how mitochondria maintain osmotic balance across the inner mitochondrial membrane, although the membrane contains aquaporins that are believed to be conduits for regulated water transport. Mitochondrial matrix has a pH of about 7.8, which is higher than the pH of the intermembrane space of the mitochondria, which is around 7.0–7.4. Mitochondrial DNA was discovered by Nash and Margit in 1963. One to many double stranded mainly circular DNA is present in mitochondrial matrix. Mitochondrial DNA is 1% of total DNA of a cell. It is rich in guanine and cytosine content, and in humans is maternally derived. Mitochondria of mammals have 55S ribosomes.

== Composition ==
=== Metabolites ===
The matrix is host to a wide variety of metabolites involved in processes within the matrix. The citric acid cycle involves acyl-CoA, pyruvate, acetyl-CoA, citrate, isocitrate, α-ketoglutarate, succinyl-CoA, fumarate, succinate, L-malate, and oxaloacetate. Malonyl-CoA is also present, where it serves as the two-carbon donor for mitochondrial fatty acid synthesis (mtFAS) and as a donor for lysine malonylation. The urea cycle makes use of L-ornithine, carbamoyl phosphate, and L-citrulline. The electron transport chain oxidizes coenzymes NADH and FADH2. Protein synthesis makes use of mitochondrial DNA, RNA, and tRNA. Regulation of processes makes use of ions (Ca^{2+}/K^{+}/Mg^{+}). Additional metabolites present in the matrix are CO_{2}_{,} H_{2}O, O_{2}_{,} ATP, ADP, and P_{i}.

=== Enzymes ===
Enzymes from processes that take place in the matrix. The citric acid cycle is facilitated by pyruvate dehydrogenase, citrate synthase, aconitase, isocitrate dehydrogenase, α-ketoglutarate dehydrogenase, succinyl-CoA synthetase, fumarase, and malate dehydrogenase. The urea cycle is facilitated by carbamoyl phosphate synthetase I and ornithine transcarbamylase. β-Oxidation uses pyruvate carboxylase, acyl-CoA dehydrogenase, and β-ketothiolase. Mitochondrial fatty acid synthesis is facilitated by at least six enzymes, including malonyl-CoA:ACP transacylase (MCAT), 3-ketoacyl-ACP synthase (OXSM), 3-ketoacyl reductase (HSD17B8), 3-hydroxyacyl-ACP dehydratase 2 (HTD2), and trans-2-enoyl-ACP reductase (MECR), together with a mitochondrial acyl carrier protein (mtACP). This enzyme system is organized as individual, matrix-soluble proteins, in contrast to the single, multi-domain enzyme FASN of cytosolic fatty acid synthesis. Amino acid production is facilitated by transaminases. Amino acid metabolism is mediated by proteases, such as presequence protease.

=== Non-enzymatic proteins ===
Members of the superfamily of LYRM proteins – with the exception of LYRM3 and LYRM6, which are embedded in mitochondrial Complex I – are primarily soluble mitochondrial matrix proteins. They are involved in the assembly of electron transport chain complexes and mitochondrial ribosomes, as well as in iron–sulfur cluster biogenesis and the function of the electron-transfer flavoprotein (ETF).

=== Inner membrane components ===
The inner membrane is a phospholipid bilayer that contains the complexes of oxidative phosphorylation. which contains the electron transport chain that is found on the cristae of the inner membrane and consists of four protein complexes and ATP synthase. These complexes are complex I (NADH:coenzyme Q oxidoreductase), complex II (succinate:coenzyme Q oxidoreductase), complex III (coenzyme Q: cytochrome c oxidoreductase), and complex IV (cytochrome c oxidase).

=== Inner membrane control over matrix composition ===
The electron transport chain is responsible for establishing a pH and electrochemical gradient that facilitates the production of ATP through the pumping of protons. The gradient also provides control of the concentration of ions such as Ca^{2+} driven by the mitochondrial membrane potential. The membrane only allows nonpolar molecules such as CO_{2} and O_{2} and small non charged polar molecules such as H_{2}O to enter the matrix. Molecules enter and exit the mitochondrial matrix through transport proteins and ion transporters. Molecules are then able to leave the mitochondria through porin. These attributed characteristics allow for control over concentrations of ions and metabolites necessary for regulation and determines the rate of ATP production.

== Processes ==
=== Citric acid cycle ===
Following glycolysis, the citric acid cycle is activated by the production of acetyl-CoA. The oxidation of pyruvate by pyruvate dehydrogenase in the matrix produces CO_{2}, acetyl-CoA, and NADH. Beta oxidation of fatty acids serves as an alternate catabolic pathway that produces acetyl-CoA, NADH, and FADH_{2}. The production of acetyl-CoA begins the citric acid cycle while the co-enzymes produced are used in the electron transport chain.

ATP synthesis as seen from the perspective of the matrix. Conditions produced by the relationships between the catabolic pathways (citric acid cycle and oxidative phosphorylation) and structural makeup (lipid bilayer and electron transport chain) of matrix facilitate ATP synthesis.

All of the enzymes for the citric acid cycle are in the matrix (e.g. citrate synthase, isocitrate dehydrogenase, α-ketoglutarate dehydrogenase, fumarase, and malate dehydrogenase) except for succinate dehydrogenase which is on the inner membrane and is part of protein complex II in the electron transport chain. The cycle produces coenzymes NADH and FADH_{2} through the oxidation of carbons in two cycles. The oxidation of NADH and FADH_{2} produces GTP from succinyl-CoA synthetase.

=== Oxidative phosphorylation ===
NADH and FADH_{2} are produced in the matrix or transported in through porin and transport proteins in order to undergo oxidation through oxidative phosphorylation. NADH and FADH_{2} undergo oxidation in the electron transport chain by transferring an electrons to regenerate NAD^{+} and FAD. Protons are pulled into the intermembrane space by the energy of the electrons going through the electron transport chain. Four electrons are finally accepted by oxygen in the matrix to complete the electron transport chain. The protons return to the mitochondrial matrix through the protein ATP synthase. The energy is used in order to rotate ATP synthase which facilitates the passage of a proton, producing ATP. A pH difference between the matrix and intermembrane space creates an electrochemical gradient by which ATP synthase can pass a proton into the matrix favorably.

=== Mitochondrial fatty acid synthesis ===
Schematic representation of mitochondrial fatty acid synthesis (mtFAS), illustrating stepwise elongation of fatty acyl chains on mitochondrial acyl carrier protein (mtACP) and formation of acyl-mtACP species of varying chain length (e.g. octanoyl-, myristoyl-, and palmitoyl-mtACP).

In response to the availability of mitochondrial acetyl-CoA, mitochondrial fatty acid synthesis (mtFAS) produces fatty acyl chains. These are synthesized on the mitochondrial acyl carrier protein (mtACP), where they are elongated by two-carbon units in each cycle. After chain elongation, fatty acyl chains are thought to remain bound to mtACP rather than being released as free fatty acids, as no mitochondrial acyl-mtACP thioesterase has been identified. As a result, mtFAS generates acyl-mtACP species of varying lengths that serve distinct functions: Octanoyl-mtACP (C8) is a precursor for lipoic acid synthesis, thereby enabling lysine lipoylation required for the catalytic activity of key mitochondrial enzyme complexes, including the pyruvate dehydrogenase complex (PDC), oxoglutarate dehydrogenase complex (OGDC), 2-oxoadipate dehydrogenase complex (OADHC), branched-chain alpha-keto acid dehydrogenase complex (BCKDC), and the glycine cleavage system (GCS). By contrast, longer acyl-mtACP species allosterically regulate LYRM proteins, which are required for iron–sulfur cluster biogenesis, assembly of electron transport chain complexes, and the function of the electron-transfer flavoprotein (ETF).

=== Urea cycle ===
The first two steps of the urea cycle take place within the mitochondrial matrix of liver and kidney cells. In the first step ammonia is converted into carbamoyl phosphate through the investment of two ATP molecules. This step is facilitated by carbamoyl phosphate synthetase I. The second step facilitated by ornithine transcarbamylase converts carbamoyl phosphate and ornithine into citrulline. After these initial steps the urea cycle continues in the inner membrane space until ornithine once again enters the matrix through a transport channel to continue the first to steps within matrix.

=== Transamination ===
α-Ketoglutarate and oxaloacetate can be converted into amino acids within the matrix through the process of transamination. These reactions are facilitated by transaminases in order to produce aspartate and asparagine from oxaloacetate. Transamination of α-ketoglutarate produces glutamate, proline, and arginine. These amino acids are then used either within the matrix or transported into the cytosol to produce proteins.

=== Regulation ===
Regulation within the matrix is primarily controlled by ion concentration, metabolite concentration and energy charge. Availability of ions such as Ca^{2+} control various functions of the citric acid cycle. in the matrix activates pyruvate dehydrogenase, isocitrate dehydrogenase, and α-ketoglutarate dehydrogenase which increases the reaction rate in the cycle. Concentration of intermediates and coenzymes in the matrix also increase or decrease the rate of ATP production due to anaplerotic and cataplerotic effects. NADH can act as an inhibitor for α-ketoglutarate, isocitrate dehydrogenase, citrate synthase, and pyruvate dehydrogenase. The concentration of oxaloacetate in particular is kept low, so any fluctuations in this concentrations serve to drive the citric acid cycle forward. The production of ATP also serves as a means of regulation by acting as an inhibitor for isocitrate dehydrogenase, pyruvate dehydrogenase, the electron transport chain protein complexes, and ATP synthase. ADP acts as an activator.

=== Protein synthesis ===
The mitochondria contains its own mitochondrial DNA used to produce proteins found in the electron transport chain. The mitochondrial DNA only codes for about thirteen proteins that are used in processing mitochondrial transcripts, ribosomal proteins, ribosomal RNA, transfer RNA, and protein subunits found in the protein complexes of the electron transport chain.

== See also ==
- Matrix (biology)
- Mitochondrial DNA
- Mitochondrion
