= ISCS =

ISCS may refer to:

- Cysteine desulfurase, an enzyme
  - NFS1, human cysteine desulfurase
- Shared-cost service
