= LYRM7 =

Protein-coding gene in humans

Identifiers
- Aliases: LYRM7, C5orf31, MC3DN8, MZM1L, LYR motif containing 7
- External IDs: OMIM: 615831; MGI: 1922780; GeneCards: LYRM7

Gene location (Human)
| Chr. | Chromosome 5 (human) |
| Band | 5q23.3-q31.1 | Start | 131,170,944 bp |
| Band | 5q23.3-q31.1 | End | 131,205,428 bp |

Gene location (Mouse)
| Chr. | Chromosome 11 (mouse) |
| Band | 11|11 B1.3 | Start | 54,717,692 bp |
| Band | 11|11 B1.3 | End | 54,751,742 bp |
RNA expression pattern
| Bgee | Human / Mouse (ortholog); Top expressed in: myocardium of left ventricle; vastus lateralis muscle; deltoid muscle; cardiac muscle tissue of right atrium; biceps brachii; Skeletal muscle tissue of biceps brachii; Skeletal muscle tissue of rectus abdominis; pons; tibialis anterior muscle; body of tongue / Top expressed in: muscle of thigh; spermatid; seminiferous tubule; primary visual cortex; superior frontal gyrus; yolk sac; neural layer of retina; blastocyst; embryo; zygote; More reference expression data |
| BioGPS | n/a |
Gene ontology
| Molecular function | protein binding |
| Cellular component | mitochondrion; mitochondrial matrix; mitochondrial membranes |
| Biological process | mitochondrial respiratory chain complex III assembly; cellular respiration |
Sources:Amigo / QuickGO
Orthologs
| Databases | NCBI: entry; OMA: entry |
| Species | Human | Mouse |
| Entrez | 90624 | 75530 |
| Ensembl | ENSG00000186687 | ENSMUSG00000020268 |
| UniProt | Q5U5X0 | Q9DA03 |
| RefSeq (mRNA) | NM_001293735; NM_181705 | NM_029327; NM_001363191 |
| RefSeq (protein) | NP_001280664; NP_859056 | NP_083603; NP_001350120 |
| Location (UCSC) | Chr 5: 131.17 – 131.21 Mb | Chr 11: 54.72 – 54.75 Mb |
| PubMed search |
- Wikidata
| View/Edit Human | View/Edit Mouse |

LYR motif containing 7, also known as Complex III assembly factor LYRM7 or LYR motif-containing protein 7, is a protein that in humans is encoded by the LYRM7 gene. It belongs to the superfamily of LYRM proteins, which are characterized by a conserved leucine–tyrosine–arginine motif. The protein encoded by this gene is a nuclear-encoded mitochondrial matrix protein that stabilizes UQCRFS1 and chaperones it to the CIII complex. Defects in this gene are a cause of mitochondrial complex III deficiency, nuclear type 8. Three transcript variants encoding two different isoforms have been found for this gene.

== Structure ==
The LYRM7 gene is located on the q arm of chromosome 5 at position 23.3 to 31.1, spans 34,512 base pairs, and has 5 exons. The LYRM7 gene produces a 6.2 kDa protein composed of 53 amino acids, which is a soluble matrix protein with an N-terminal LYR motif. LYRM7 is an assembly factor of the enzyme Ubiquinol Cytochrome c Reductase (UQCR, Complex III or Cytochrome bc1 complex) of the mitochondrial respiratory chain.

== Function ==
The LYRM7 gene encodes for an assembly factor necessary for the incorporation of the iron-sulfur cluster in the Rieske (Fe-S) protein (UQCRFS1), which is an essential subunit of the Ubiquinol Cytochrome c Reductase (complex III) of the mitochondrial respiratory chain. LYRM7 acts by binding to the co-chaperone HSC20 of the Fe-S biogenesis machinery, which brings a cluster assembled on the main scaffold protein ISCU. Direct binding of HSC20 to the LYR motif of LYRM7 in a pre-assembled UQCRFS1-LYRM7 intermediate in the mitochondrial matrix facilitates transfer of the Fe-S cluster from holo-ISCU to UQCRFS1.

UQCRFS1, or Rieske (Fe-S) protein (UQCRFS1) is the last catalytic subunit added to the complex. Complex III is required for the catalysis of electron transfer from coenzyme Q to cytochrome c as well as the pumping of protons into the inner membrane from the matrix for the generation of an ATP-coupled electrochemical potential.

== Clinical significance ==
Variants of LYRM7 have been associated with mitochondrial complex III deficiency, nuclear 8 (MC3DN8). Mitochondrial complex III deficiency, nuclear 8 is a form of mitochondrial complex III deficiency, a disorder of Complex III of the mitochondrial respiratory chain. The deficiency is known to be highly variable in phenotype depending on which tissues are affected. Clinical features include mitochondrial encephalopathy, psychomotor retardation, ataxia, severe failure to thrive, liver dysfunction, renal tubulopathy, muscle weakness and exercise intolerance. Pathogenic Mutations of the LYRM7 gene have included (c.73G>A), (c.214C>T), (c.37delA), and others.
