= Intermediate cleaving peptidase 55 =

Class of enzymes

Identifiers
- EC no.: 3.4.11.26

Databases
- IntEnz: IntEnz view
- BRENDA: BRENDA entry
- ExPASy: NiceZyme view
- KEGG: KEGG entry
- MetaCyc: metabolic pathway
- PRIAM: profile
- PDB structures: RCSB PDB PDBe PDBsum
Search
- PMC: articles
- PubMed: articles
- NCBI: proteins

Intermediate cleaving peptidase 55 (EC 3.4.11.26, Icp55, mitochondrial intermediate cleaving peptidase 55 kDa) is an enzyme. This enzyme catalyses the following chemical reaction

The enzyme cleaves the Pro36-Pro37 bond of cysteine desulfurase (EC 2.8.1.7) removing three amino acid residues (Tyr-Ser-Pro) from the N-terminus after cleavage by mitochondrial processing peptidase.

Icp55 removes the destabilizing N-terminal amino acid residues.
