= 6-hydroxynicotinate dehydrogenase =

Class of enzymes

Identifiers
- EC no.: 1.17.3.3

Databases
- IntEnz: IntEnz view
- BRENDA: BRENDA entry
- ExPASy: NiceZyme view
- KEGG: KEGG entry
- MetaCyc: metabolic pathway
- PRIAM: profile
- PDB structures: RCSB PDB PDBe PDBsum
- Gene Ontology: AmiGO / QuickGO
Search
- PMC: articles
- PubMed: articles
- NCBI: proteins

6-hydroxynicotinate dehydrogenase (EC 1.17.3.3) is an enzyme that catalyzes the chemical reaction

6-hydroxyniacin
O_{2} + H_{2}O
H_{2}O_{2}
2,6-dihydroxynicotinic acid

The three substrates of this enzyme are 6-hydroxyniacin, water, and oxygen. Its products are 2,6-dihydroxynicotinic acid and hydrogen peroxide.

The enzyme isolated from Bacillus niacini is an oxidoreductase that contains an iron–sulfur cluster and uses flavin adenine dinucleotide and molybdenum. The systematic name of this enzyme class is 6-hydroxynicotinate:O2 oxidoreductase. Other names in common use include 6-hydroxynicotinic acid hydroxylase, 6-hydroxynicotinic acid dehydrogenase, and 6-hydroxynicotinate hydroxylase.
