= YME1L1 =

Protein-coding gene in the species Homo sapiens

Identifiers
- Aliases: YME1L1, FTSH, MEG4, PAMP, YME1L, YME1 like 1 ATPase, OPA11
- External IDs: OMIM: 607472; MGI: 1351651; GeneCards: YME1L1

Gene location (Human)
Chr.	Chromosome 10 (human)
Band	10p12.1	Start	27,110,111 bp
Band	10p12.1	End	27,155,266 bp

Gene location (Mouse)
Chr.	Chromosome 2 (mouse)
Band	2|2 A3	Start	23,046,381 bp
Band	2|2 A3	End	23,089,272 bp
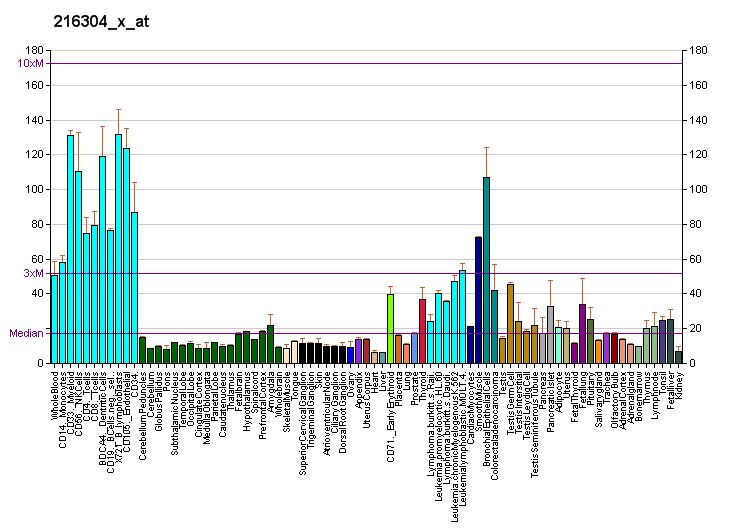

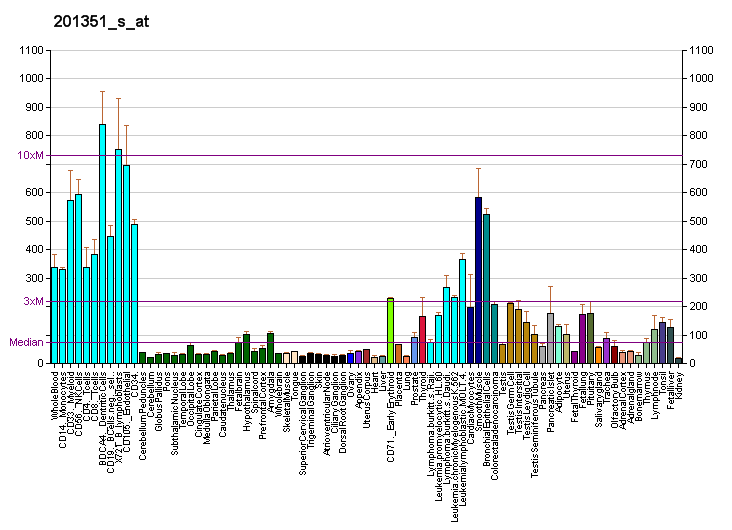

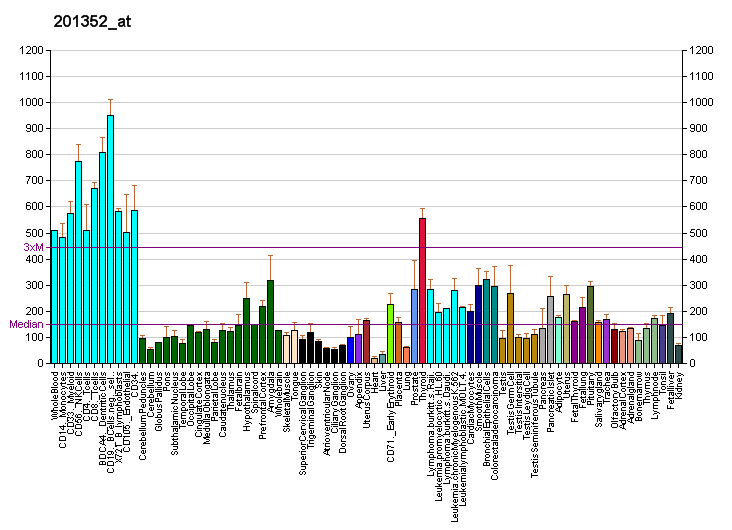
RNA expression pattern
Bgee	Human / Mouse (ortholog); Top expressed in: germinal epithelium; tibia; parietal pleura; visceral pleura; amniotic fluid; corpus epididymis; gingival epithelium; Epithelium of choroid plexus; tail of epididymis; caput epididymis / Top expressed in: pineal gland; yolk sac; seminiferous tubule; spermatid; submandibular gland; tail of embryo; genital tubercle; seminal vesicula; Gonadal ridge; gastrula; More reference expression data
BioGPS	More reference expression data
Gene ontology
Molecular function	metallopeptidase activity; peptidase activity; hydrolase activity; metalloendopeptidase activity; ATP binding; metal ion binding; nucleotide binding; protein binding; ATP-dependent peptidase activity
Cellular component	integral component of membrane; mitochondrion; membrane; nuclear body; mitochondrial inner membrane
Biological process	mitochondrion organization; proteolysis; cell population proliferation; protein quality control for misfolded or incompletely synthesized proteins; mitochondrial protein catabolic process; mitochondrial calcium ion transmembrane transport; negative regulation of apoptotic process; protein hexamerization; mitochondrial protein processing
Sources:Amigo / QuickGO
Orthologs
Databases	NCBI: entry; OMA: entry
Species	Human	Mouse
Entrez	10730	27377
Ensembl	ENSG00000136758	ENSMUSG00000026775
UniProt	Q96TA2; Q5T8D2	O88967
RefSeq (mRNA)	NM_001253866; NM_014263; NM_139312; NM_139313	NM_013771
RefSeq (protein)	NP_001240795; NP_055078; NP_647473	NP_038799
Location (UCSC)	Chr 10: 27.11 – 27.16 Mb	Chr 2: 23.05 – 23.09 Mb
PubMed search
- Wikidata
View/Edit Human	View/Edit Mouse

ATP-dependent metalloprotease YME1L1 is an enzyme that in humans is encoded by the YME1L1 gene. YME1L1 belongs to the AAA family of ATPases and mainly functions in the maintenance of mitochondrial morphology. Mutations in this gene would cause infantile-onset mitochondriopathy.

== Gene ==
The YME1L1 gene is located at chromosome 10p14, consisting of 20 exons. Two transcript variants encoding different isoforms have been found for this gene.

== Structure ==
YME1L1 consists of 716 amino acids and is highly similar to mitochondrial AAA proteases and in particular to yeast Yme1p. Three different domains are identified via sequence analysis, including an AAA consensus sequence between amino acids 317 and 502, an ATP/GTP binding motif, and a HEXXH motif typical of a zinc-dependent binding domain.

== Function ==
YME1L1 is embedded in the inner mitochondrial membrane and is more abundant in tissues with a high content of mitochondria such as human adult heart, skeletal muscle, and pancreas RNA. YME1L1 is a member of the AAA family of ATPases and has an important role for the maintenance of mitochondrial morphology. Its mature form assembles into a homo-oligomeric complex within the inner mitochondrial membrane (IM). It degrades both intermembrane space and IM proteins, including lipid transfer proteins, components of protein translocases of the IM, and the dynamin-like GTPase optic atrophy 1 (OPA1) Loss of YME1L1 accelerates OMA1-dependent long-form OPA1 cleavage, resulting in short-form OPA1 accumulation, increased mitochondrial fission, and mitochondrial network fragmentation. It's also reported that YME1L1 controls the accumulation of respiratory chain subunits and is required for apoptotic resistance, cristae morphogenesis, and cell proliferation.

== Clinical significance ==
A homozygous mutation in the YME1L1 gene would cause infantile-onset mitochondriopathy, with severe intellectual disability, muscular impairments, and optic nerve atrophy. The missense mutation affects the MPP processing site and impairs YME1L1 maturation, leading to its rapid degradation, and also leads to a proliferation defect, abnormal OPA1 processing and mitochondrial fragmentation.

== Interactions ==
- OPA1
- OMA1
