= Mitochondrial processing peptidase =

Identifiers
- EC no.: 3.4.24.64
- CAS no.: 86280-61-7

Databases
- IntEnz: IntEnz view
- BRENDA: BRENDA entry
- ExPASy: NiceZyme view
- KEGG: KEGG entry
- MetaCyc: metabolic pathway
- PRIAM: profile
- PDB structures: RCSB PDB PDBe PDBsum
Search
- PMC: articles
- PubMed: articles
- NCBI: proteins

Mitochondrial processing peptidase is an enzyme complex found in mitochondria which cleaves signal sequences from mitochondrial proteins. In humans this complex is composed of two subunits encoded by the genes PMPCA, and PMPCB. The enzyme is also known as (EC 3.4.24.64, processing enhancing peptidase (for one of two subunits), mitochondrial protein precursor-processing proteinase, matrix peptidase, matrix processing peptidase, matrix processing proteinase, or MPP). This enzyme catalyses the following chemical reaction

Release of N-terminal targeting peptides from precursor proteins imported into the mitochondrion, typically with Arg in position P2

This enzyme is present the mitochondrial matrix of fungi and mammals.

== Function ==
Mitochondria import the majority of their proteins from the cell cytosol. In order to achieve this, many mitochondrial proteins encode a short targeting signal which directs them to the mitochondrion and through its preprotein translocase machinery. Mitochondrial proteins which reach the innermost mitochondrial compartment, the Mitochondrial matrix, often undergo proteolytic cleavage of the targeting signal, performed by the Mitochondrial Processing Peptidase (MPP), this is often necessary for the maturation of the preprotein to its functional form or to reveal additional targeting sequences.

In most eukaryotes, the MPP consists of two subunits, an α and β subunit which bind together to form a heterodimeric complex. In humans these are the genes PMPCA and PMPCB. The subunits of the MPP are highly conserved, and have shown to be interoperable between species, homologues to MPPs are also found in eukaryotes whose mitochondria have evolved into divergent organelles, though in the case of Trichomonas the processing peptidase complex appears to be made of two β subunits.

== Structure and Mechanism ==
The X-ray structures of yeast MPP, and a cleavage-deficient MPP with substrate bound, are available. The sequence around the scissile bond binds as a beta strand in such a way that the scissile bond aligns with the zinc binding site to allow nucleophilic attack by a zinc—coordinated water molecule on the carbonyl carbon of the residue before the scissile bond (last residue of the signal peptide).

== Evolution ==
The origins of the mitochondrial processing peptidases are thought to be prokaryotic in origin, possibly originating in the endosymbiont which developed into the mitochondrion, this hypothesis has been supported by the discovery of a bacterial signal peptidase in Rickettsia, an organism thought to be a closely related to the mitochondrial progenitor. Experimentally this peptidase was shown to cleave signal sequences from mitochondrial proteins.

== See also ==
- Translocase of the outer membrane
- Signal peptidase
- PMPCA
- PMPCB
