= OMA1 =

Protein-coding gene in humans

Identifiers
- Aliases: OMA1, 2010001O09Rik, DAB1, MPRP-1, YKR087C, ZMPpeptidase, OMA1 zinc metallopeptidase, MPRP1
- External IDs: OMIM: 617081; MGI: 1914263; GeneCards: OMA1

Gene location (Human)
Chr.	Chromosome 1 (human)
Band	1p32.2-p32.1	Start	58,415,384 bp
Band	1p32.2-p32.1	End	58,546,802 bp

Gene location (Mouse)
Chr.	Chromosome 4 (mouse)
Band	4|4 C6	Start	103,171,009 bp
Band	4|4 C6	End	103,229,065 bp
RNA expression pattern
Bgee	Human / Mouse (ortholog); Top expressed in: bronchial epithelial cell; Achilles tendon; mucosa of paranasal sinus; muscle of thigh; bone marrow cell; testicle; right uterine tube; epithelium of colon; corpus callosum; gonad / Top expressed in: interventricular septum; zygote; transitional epithelium of urinary bladder; right ventricle; myocardium of ventricle; sternocleidomastoid muscle; digastric muscle; temporal muscle; epithelium of stomach; vastus lateralis muscle; More reference expression data
BioGPS	n/a
Gene ontology
Molecular function	peptidase activity; hydrolase activity; metallopeptidase activity; metal ion binding; metalloendopeptidase activity
Cellular component	membrane; integral component of membrane; mitochondrial membranes; mitochondrion; mitochondrial inner membrane
Biological process	mitochondrial protein processing; energy homeostasis; response to stress; mitochondrion organization; cristae formation; protein quality control for misfolded or incompletely synthesized proteins; negative regulation of mitochondrial fusion; proteolysis; lipid metabolism; glucose metabolic process; diet induced thermogenesis; regulation of apoptotic process; positive regulation of cold-induced thermogenesis
Sources:Amigo / QuickGO
Orthologs
Databases	NCBI: entry; OMA: entry
Species	Human	Mouse
Entrez	115209	67013
Ensembl	ENSG00000162600	ENSMUSG00000035069
UniProt	Q96E52	Q9D8H7
RefSeq (mRNA)	NM_145243	NM_025909
RefSeq (protein)	NP_660286	NP_080185
Location (UCSC)	Chr 1: 58.42 – 58.55 Mb	Chr 4: 103.17 – 103.23 Mb
PubMed search
- Wikidata
View/Edit Human	View/Edit Mouse

Metalloendopeptidase OMA1, mitochondrial is an enzyme that in humans is encoded by the OMA1 gene. OMA1 is a Zn^{2+}-dependent metalloendopeptidase in the inner membrane of mitochondria. The OMA1 acronym was derived from overlapping proteolytic activity with m-AAA protease 1.

The OMA1 protease acts at the intersection of a mitochondrial quality control system and energy metabolism, whereby its activation correlates with outer membrane permeabilization and cytochrome c release in the context of apoptosis.

Mammalian OMA1 can cleave the inner-membrane shaping protein OPA1 and the signaling peptide DELE1 in a context-dependent manner.

== Gene ==
The human OMA1 gene spans with 9 exons 66 kb of the reverse strand of the short arm of chromosome 1 (1p32.2-p32.1). OMA1 is conserved and homologues have been identified in model organisms, such as mice and yeast. Yet, no homologous have been found in C. elegans and drosophila.

== Structure ==
The human OMA1 protein comprises 524 amino acids. The nuclear encoded protein exhibits an amino-terminal mitochondrial import sequence, which is removed upon import giving rise to a 43.8 kDa mature protease. OMA1 has a HEXXH Zn^{2+}-binding motive and the MEROPS database classifies OMA1 as metalloendopeptidase of the M48C-family. OMA1's structure has not yet been resolved. Two controversial models describe OMA1 either as membrane-anchored protease or as integral membrane protease. Google's AlphaFold predictions are more aligned with the latter model, but have so far not provided a realistic 3D structure. OMA1's context-dependent regulation is not understood. The mammalian protein has an extended carboxy-terminus, which may be involved in its regulation.

== Function ==
OMA1's function evolved over time with distinct substrates in invertebrates and mammals. Initially described in yeast as "a novel component of the quality control system in the inner membrane of mitochondria," mammalian OMA1 is responsible for stress-dependent OPA1 cleavage. Apoptotic stimuli, such as Bax and Bak, as well as other factors can trigger OMA1 activation and OPA1 processing, which are correlated with outer membrane permeabilization and cytochrome c release. The DELE1 protein is another OMA1 substrate, which is released upon cleavage into the cytosol, where it can activate the integrated stress response. OMA1 and the i-AAA protease share the OPA1 substrate and were suggested to regulate each other by reciprocal proteolytic hydrolysis. OMA1 functionally interacts with the eponymous m-AAA protease and other scaffold proteins in the inner membrane, such as the prohibitins PHB1 and PHB2.

== Clinical significance ==
OMA1 is not directly linked to a specific disease. 3 heterozygous coding sequence variants of uncertain significance were identified in the OMA1 gene in a screen of 190 individuals with amyotrophic lateral sclerosis (ALS). Whole exome sequencing of 1,000 individuals with heart failure revealed an association with the coding polymorphism rs17117699 (OMA1 p.Phe211Cys). OMA1 may still have disease relevance through its substrates OPA1 and DELE1. Also certain misrouted PINK1 mutants pertaining to Parkinson's disease were found to be digested by OMA1. Conditional OMA1 activation in neurons led to neurodegeneration with tau hyperphosphorylation in mice. OMA1 knockout mice by contrast show mild energy-metabolic alterations without apparent impact on survival or lifespan. OMA1 was also suggested to be relevant for cancer given OMA1's energy-metabolic regulation and stress-dependent signaling.
