= PITRM1 =

Protein-coding gene in humans

Identifiers
- Aliases: PITRM1, MP1, PreP, pitrilysin metallopeptidase 1, SCAR30
- External IDs: OMIM: 618211; MGI: 1916867; GeneCards: PITRM1
Available structures
PDB	Ortholog search: PDBe RCSB
PDB	List of PDB id codes 4L3T, 4NGE, 4RPU

Gene location (Human)
Chr.	Chromosome 10 (human)
Band	10p15.2	Start	3,137,728 bp
Band	10p15.2	End	3,172,841 bp

Gene location (Mouse)
Chr.	Chromosome 13 (mouse)
Band	13|13 A1	Start	6,598,185 bp
Band	13|13 A1	End	6,630,551 bp
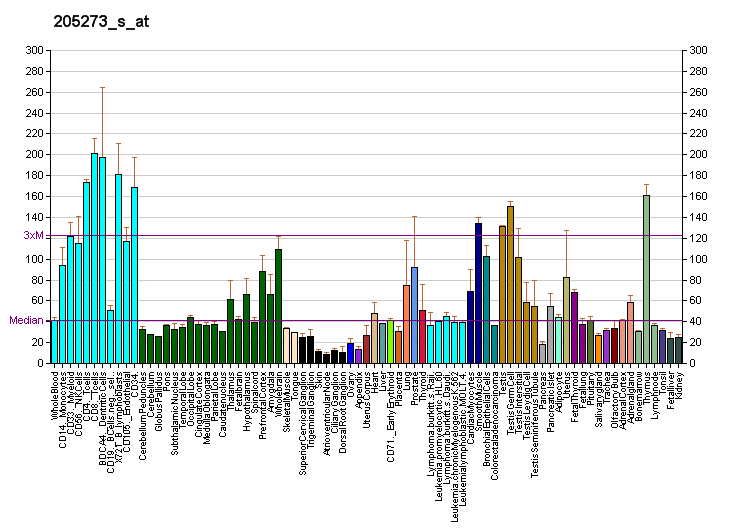
RNA expression pattern
Bgee	Human / Mouse (ortholog); Top expressed in: apex of heart; right adrenal cortex; anterior pituitary; left testis; left adrenal gland; left adrenal cortex; right frontal lobe; Descending thoracic aorta; right testis; left ovary / Top expressed in: tail of embryo; genital tubercle; fetal liver hematopoietic progenitor cell; gastrula; epiblast; primitive streak; placenta; cumulus cell; hair follicle; endothelial cell of lymphatic vessel; More reference expression data
BioGPS	More reference expression data
Gene ontology
Molecular function	peptidase activity; enzyme activator activity; catalytic activity; hydrolase activity; metal ion binding; metallopeptidase activity; metalloendopeptidase activity; zinc ion binding
Cellular component	mitochondrion; mitochondrial matrix
Biological process	positive regulation of catalytic activity; protein targeting to mitochondrion; proteolysis; protein processing
Sources:Amigo / QuickGO
Orthologs
Databases	NCBI: entry; OMA: entry
Species	Human	Mouse
Entrez	10531	69617
Ensembl	ENSG00000107959	ENSMUSG00000021193
UniProt	Q5JRX3	Q8K411
RefSeq (mRNA)	NM_001242307; NM_001242309; NM_014889; NM_014968; NM_001347725 NM_001347726; NM_001347727; NM_001347728; NM_001347729; NM_001347730	NM_145131; NM_001360106
RefSeq (protein)	NP_001229236; NP_001229238; NP_001334654; NP_001334655; NP_001334656 NP_001334657; NP_001334658; NP_001334659; NP_055704	NP_660113; NP_001347035
Location (UCSC)	Chr 10: 3.14 – 3.17 Mb	Chr 13: 6.6 – 6.63 Mb
PubMed search
- Wikidata
View/Edit Human	View/Edit Mouse

Pitrilysin metallopeptidase 1 also known as presequence protease, mitochondrial (PreP) and metalloprotease 1 (MTP-1) is an enzyme that in humans is encoded by the PITRM1 gene. It is also sometimes called metalloprotease 1 (MP1).PreP facilitates proteostasis by utilizing an ~13300-A(3) catalytic chamber to degrade toxic peptides, including mitochondrial presequences and β-amyloid. Deficiency of PreP is found associated with Alzheimer's disease. Reduced levels of PreP via RNAi mediated knockdown have been shown to lead to defective maturation of the protein frataxin.

== Structure ==
=== Gene ===
The PITRM1 gene is located at chromosome 10q15.2, consisting of 28 exons.

=== Protein ===
PreP is a 117 kDa M16C enzyme that is widely expressed in human tissues. PreP is composed of PreP-N (aa 33-509) and PreP-C (aa 576-1037) domains, which are connected by an extended helical hairpin (aa 510-575). Its structure demonstrates that substrate selection by size-exclusion is a conserved mechanism in M16C proteases.

== Function ==
PreP is an Zn^{2+}-dependent and ATP-independent metalloprotease, it does not select substrates on the basis of post-translational modifications or embedded degradation tags. Instead, it uses a negatively charged catalytic chamber to engulf substrates peptides of up to ~65 residues while excluding larger, folded proteins. It primarily localizes to the mitochondrial matrix, and cuts a range of peptides into recyclable fragments. The substrates of PreP are vital to proteostasis, as they can insert to mitochondrial membranes, disrupting electrical potential and uncoupling respiration. Thus deletion of PRTRM1 leads to a delayed growth phenotype. Notabley, PreP degrades several functionally relevant Aβ species, the aggregates of which are toxic to the neuron and play a key role in AD pathogenesis.

== Clinical significance ==
PreP is the Aβ-degrading protease in mitochondria. Immune-depletion of PreP in brain mitochondria prevents degradation of mitochondrial Aβ, and PreP activity is found diminished in AD patients. It has been reported that the loss of PreP activity is due to methionine oxidation and this study provides a rational basis for therapeutic intervention in conditions characterized by excessive oxidation of PreP. A recent study also suggests that PreP regulates islet amyloid polypeptide in beta cells. Two siblings carrying a homozygous PITRM1 missense mutation (c.548G>A, p.Arg183Gln) were reported to be associated with an autosomal recessive, slowly progressive syndrome. Clinical features include mental retardation, spinocerebellar ataxia, cognitive decline and psychosis. A mouse model hemizygous for PITRM1 displayed progressive ataxia which was suggested to be linked to brain degenerative lesions, including accumulation of Aβ‐positive amyloid deposits. Recently, two brothers from a consanguineous family presenting with childhood-onset recessive cerebellar pathology were shown to carry a homozygous mutation in PITRM1 (c.2795C>T, p.T931M). This mutation resulted in 95% reduction in PITRM1 protein. PITRM1 knockdown was shown to lead to reduced levels of mature Frataxin protein, a protein that when deficient causes Friedreich's ataxia, and may be implicated in pathology in patients carrying PITRM1 mutations.

== Interactions ==
PITRM1 has been shown to interact with the following proteins: CCL22, CGB2, DDX41, DEFB104A, HDHD3, MRPL12, NDUFV2, PRDX6, PRKCSH, RARS2, RIF1, SUCLG2, TEKT3, TERF2, and VAPB.
