= PMPCA =

Protein-coding gene in humans

Identifiers
- Aliases: PMPCA, Alpha-MPP, INPP5E, P-55, SCAR2, peptidase, mitochondrial processing alpha subunit, CLA1, CPD3, peptidase, mitochondrial processing subunit alpha, MAS2
- External IDs: OMIM: 613036; MGI: 1918568; GeneCards: PMPCA

Gene location (Human)
| Chr. | Chromosome 9 (human) |
| Band | 9q34.3 | Start | 136,410,641 bp |
| Band | 9q34.3 | End | 136,423,761 bp |

Gene location (Mouse)
| Chr. | Chromosome 2 (mouse) |
| Band | 2|2 A3 | Start | 26,279,351 bp |
| Band | 2|2 A3 | End | 26,287,134 bp |
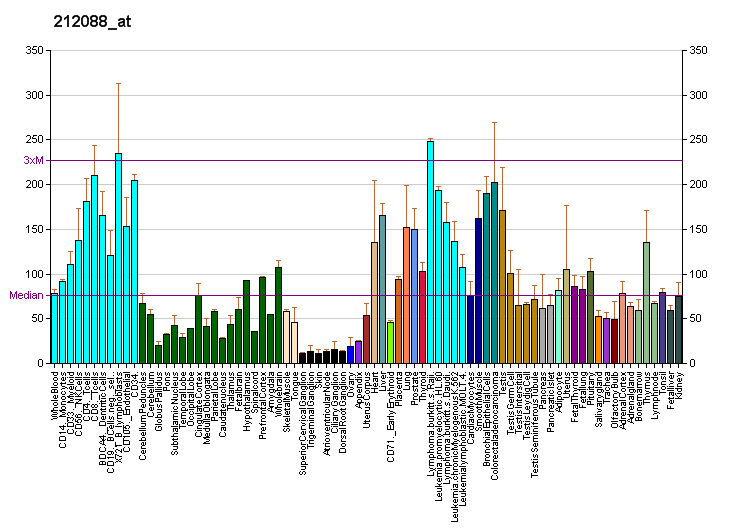
RNA expression pattern
| Bgee | Human / Mouse (ortholog); Top expressed in: right lobe of liver; apex of heart; right adrenal gland; left ventricle; right adrenal cortex; left adrenal gland; left adrenal cortex; gastrocnemius muscle; right auricle of heart; stromal cell of endometrium / Top expressed in: yolk sac; muscle of thigh; triceps brachii muscle; temporal muscle; digastric muscle; sternocleidomastoid muscle; vastus lateralis muscle; right ventricle; proximal tubule; ankle; More reference expression data |
| BioGPS | More reference expression data |
Gene ontology
| Molecular function | peptidase activity; hydrolase activity; metallopeptidase activity; metalloendopeptidase activity; zinc ion binding; metal ion binding; catalytic activity; endopeptidase activity |
| Cellular component | mitochondrial matrix; mitochondrion; membrane; mitochondrial inner membrane; extracellular space; mitochondrial processing peptidase complex |
| Biological process | proteolysis; protein processing involved in protein targeting to mitochondrion; mitochondrial calcium ion transmembrane transport |
Sources:Amigo / QuickGO
Orthologs
| Databases | NCBI: entry; OMA: entry |
| Species | Human | Mouse |
| Entrez | 23203 | 66865 |
| Ensembl | ENSG00000165688 | ENSMUSG00000026926 |
| UniProt | Q10713; Q5SXN9 | Q9DC61 |
| RefSeq (mRNA) | NM_001282944; NM_001282946; NM_015160 | NM_173180 |
| RefSeq (protein) | NP_001269873; NP_001269875; NP_055975 | NP_775272 |
| Location (UCSC) | Chr 9: 136.41 – 136.42 Mb | Chr 2: 26.28 – 26.29 Mb |
| PubMed search |
- Wikidata
| View/Edit Human | View/Edit Mouse |

Mitochondrial-processing peptidase subunit alpha is an enzyme that in humans is encoded by the PMPCA gene. This gene PMPCA encoded a protein that is a member of the peptidase M16 family. This protein is located in the mitochondrial matrix and catalyzes the cleavage of the leader peptides of precursor proteins newly imported into the mitochondria, though it only functions as part of a heterodimeric complex.

== Structure ==
The Mitochondrial-processing peptidase subunit alpha precursor protein is 58.2 KDa in size and composed of 525 amino acids. The precursor protein contains a 33 amino acid N-terminal fragment as mitochondrion targeting sequence. After cleavage, the matured PMPCA protein is 54.6 KDa in size and has a theoretical pI of 5.88.

== Function ==
Mitochondrial-processing peptidase (MPP) is a metalloendopeptidase, containing two structurally related subunits, Subunit alpha and mitochondrial-processing peptidase subunit beta, working in conjunction for its catalytic function. Containing the catalytic site, the beta subunit PMPCB protein cleaves presequences (transit peptides) from mitochondrial protein precursors and releases of N-terminal transit peptides from precursor proteins imported into the mitochondrion, typically with Arg in position P2.

== Interactions ==
As the alpha subunit of Mitochondrial-processing peptidase, PMPCA forms a heterodimer with the subunit PMPCB.

== Clinical significance ==
The majority of mitochondrial proteins is nuclear-coded, which necessitates proper translocations of mitochondrial targeting proteins. Many mitochondrial proteins are synthesized in a precursor form that contains mitochondria targeting sequence. These precursors are usually cleaved by peptidases and proteases before they arrive their sub-organellar locations. It is likely that altered activity of the mitochondrial processing peptidases is essential to ensure the correct maturation of mitochondrial proteins and that altered activity of these proteases will have dramatic effects in the activity, stability and assembly of mitochondrial proteins. Evidences showed that MPP was involved in the proteolytic maturation of Frataxin, a protein responsible for iron homeostasis. Accordingly, MPP deficiency was shown to be involved in Friedreich ataxia, an autossomic recessive neurodegenerative disorder
