= Sulfurtransferase =

Class of enzymes

A sulfurtransferase is a transferase enzyme that act upon atoms of sulfur.

An example is thiosulfate sulfurtransferase.
