= MTRF1L =

Protein-coding gene in the species Homo sapiens

Identifiers
- Aliases: MTRF1L, HMRF1L, MRF1L, mtRF1a, mitochondrial translational release factor 1 like, mitochondrial translation release factor 1 like, Mitochondrial translational release factor 1-like
- External IDs: OMIM: 613542; MGI: 1918830; HomoloGene: 5905; GeneCards: MTRF1L; OMA:MTRF1L - orthologs

Gene location (Human)
Chr.	Chromosome 6 (human)
Band	6q25.2	Start	152,987,362 bp
Band	6q25.2	End	153,002,709 bp

Gene location (Mouse)
Chr.	Chromosome 10 (mouse)
Band	10|10 A1	Start	5,761,887 bp
Band	10|10 A1	End	5,773,910 bp
RNA expression pattern
Bgee	Human / Mouse (ortholog); Top expressed in: myocardium of left ventricle; endothelial cell; buccal mucosa cell; pancreatic ductal cell; internal globus pallidus; tibialis anterior muscle; deltoid muscle; body of tongue; tendon of biceps brachii; pericardium / Top expressed in: tail of embryo; genital tubercle; otic vesicle; Paneth cell; medullary collecting duct; otolith organ; utricle; migratory enteric neural crest cell; renal corpuscle; fossa; More reference expression data
BioGPS	n/a
Gene ontology
Molecular function	translation release factor activity; translation release factor activity, codon specific; ribosome binding
Cellular component	mitochondrial matrix; mitochondrion; cytoplasm
Biological process	translational termination; protein biosynthesis; mitochondrial translational termination
Sources:Amigo / QuickGO
Orthologs
Species	Human	Mouse
Entrez	54516	108853
Ensembl	ENSG00000112031	ENSMUSG00000019774
UniProt	Q9UGC7	Q8BJU9
RefSeq (mRNA)	NM_001114184; NM_001301047; NM_001301870; NM_001301871; NM_001301872 NM_019041	NM_175374
RefSeq (protein)	NP_001107656; NP_001287976; NP_001288799; NP_001288800; NP_001288801 NP_061914	NP_780583
Location (UCSC)	Chr 6: 152.99 – 153 Mb	Chr 10: 5.76 – 5.77 Mb
PubMed search
- Wikidata
View/Edit Human	View/Edit Mouse

Mitochondrial translational release factor 1-like is a protein that in humans is encoded by the MTRF1L gene.

Mitochondrial DNA encodes 13 proteins that play essential roles in the respiratory chain, while all proteins involved in mitochondrial translation are encoded by nuclear genes that are imported from the cytoplasm. MTRF1L is a nuclear-encoded protein that functions as a releasing factor that recognizes termination codons and releases mitochondrial ribosomes from the synthesized protein (summary by Nozaki et al., 2008 [PubMed 18429816]).[supplied by OMIM].
