= PMPCB =

Protein-coding gene in humans

Identifiers
- Aliases: PMPCB, Beta-MPP, MPP11, MPPB, MPPP52, P-52, peptidase, mitochondrial processing beta subunit, peptidase, mitochondrial processing subunit beta, MAS1
- External IDs: OMIM: 603131; MGI: 1920328; GeneCards: PMPCB
Enzyme activity
EC #	BRENDA	ExPASy	KEGG	MetaCyc
3.4.24.64	↗	↗	↗	↗

Gene location (Human)
Chr.	Chromosome 7 (human)
Band	7q22.1	Start	103,297,435 bp
Band	7q22.1	End	103,329,511 bp

Gene location (Mouse)
Chr.	Chromosome 5 (mouse)
Band	5|5 A3	Start	21,942,139 bp
Band	5|5 A3	End	21,962,150 bp
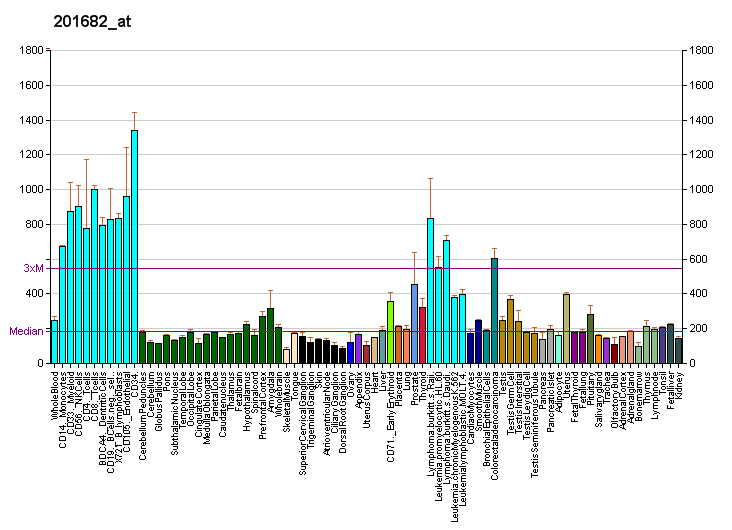
RNA expression pattern
Bgee	Human / Mouse (ortholog); Top expressed in: right adrenal cortex; parotid gland; left adrenal gland; body of pancreas; left adrenal cortex; skin of thigh; gastric mucosa; skin of hip; rectum; left ovary / Top expressed in: spermatid; spermatocyte; medullary collecting duct; renal corpuscle; cardiac muscle tissue of left ventricle; endocardial cushion; atrioventricular valve; right kidney; proximal tubule; interventricular septum; More reference expression data
BioGPS	More reference expression data
Gene ontology
Molecular function	zinc ion binding; peptidase activity; catalytic activity; hydrolase activity; metallopeptidase activity; metal ion binding; metalloendopeptidase activity; endopeptidase activity
Cellular component	mitochondrial respiratory chain complex III; mitochondrial matrix; mitochondrion; mitochondrial inner membrane; mitochondrial processing peptidase complex
Biological process	mitochondrial electron transport, ubiquinol to cytochrome c; aerobic dissimilation; protein processing; proteolysis; mitochondrial calcium ion transmembrane transport; protein processing involved in protein targeting to mitochondrion
Sources:Amigo / QuickGO
Orthologs
Databases	NCBI: entry; OMA: entry
Species	Human	Mouse
Entrez	9512	73078
Ensembl	ENSG00000105819	ENSMUSG00000029017
UniProt	O75439	Q9CXT8
RefSeq (mRNA)	NM_004279	NM_028431
RefSeq (protein)	NP_004270	NP_082707
Location (UCSC)	Chr 7: 103.3 – 103.33 Mb	Chr 5: 21.94 – 21.96 Mb
PubMed search
- Wikidata
View/Edit Human	View/Edit Mouse

Mitochondrial-processing peptidase subunit beta is an enzyme that in humans is encoded by the PMPCB gene. This gene is a member of the peptidase M16 family and encodes a protein with a zinc-binding motif. This protein is located in the mitochondrial matrix and catalyzes the cleavage of the leader peptides of precursor proteins newly imported into the mitochondria, though it only functions as part of a heterodimeric complex.

== Structure ==
The Mitochondrial-processing peptidase subunit beta precursor protein is 54.4 KDa in size and composed of 489 amino acids. The precursor protein contains a 45 amino acid N-terminal fragment as mitochondrion targeting sequence. After cleavage, the matured PMPCB protein is 49.5 KDa in size and has a theoretical pI of 5.76.

== Function ==
Mitochondrial-processing peptidase (MPP) is a metalloendopeptidase, containing two structurally related subunits, mitochondrial-processing peptidase subunit alpha and subunit beta, working in conjunction for its catalytic function. Containing the catalytic site, the beta subunit PMPCB protein cleaves presequences (transit peptides) from mitochondrial protein precursors and releases of N-terminal transit peptides from precursor proteins imported into the mitochondrion, typically with Arg in position P2.

== Interactions ==
As the beta subunit of Mitochondrial-processing peptidase, PMPCB forms a heterodimer with the subunit Mitochondrial-processing peptidase subunit alpha. In addition, PMPCB has been shown to interact with PMPCA and Frataxin.

== Clinical significance ==
The majority of mitochondrial proteins is nuclear-coded, which necessitates proper translocations of mitochondrial targeting proteins. Many mitochondrial proteins are synthesized in a precursor form that contains mitochondria targeting sequence. These precursors are usually cleaved by peptidases and proteases before they arrive their sub-organellar locations. It is likely that altered activity of the mitochondrial processing peptidases is essential to ensure the correct maturation of mitochondrial proteins and that altered activity of these proteases will have dramatic effects in the activity, stability and assembly of mitochondrial proteins. Evidences showed that MPP was involved in the proteolytic maturation of Frataxin, a protein responsible for iron homeostasis. Accordingly, MPP deficiency was shown to be involved in Friedreich ataxia, an autossomic recessive neurodegenerative disorder
