= Cysteine desulfurase =

Class of enzymes

cysteine desulfurase

Identifiers
- EC no.: 2.8.1.7

Databases
- BRENDA: enzyme data
- ExPASy: NiceZyme view
- KEGG: enzyme entry
- MetaCyc: metabolic pathway
- Rhea: reactions
- PDB structures: RCSB PDB PDBe PDBsum
- Gene Ontology: AmiGO / QuickGO
Search
- PMC: articles
- PubMed: articles
- NCBI: proteins

In enzymology, a cysteine desulfurase (EC 2.8.1.7) is an enzyme that catalyzes the chemical reaction:

L-cysteine + [enzyme]-cysteine $\rightleftharpoons$ L-alanine + [enzyme]-S-sulfanylcysteine

Thus, the two substrates of this enzyme are L-cysteine and [enzyme]-cysteine, whereas its two products are L-alanine and [enzyme]-S-sulfanylcysteine, the hydropersulfide of the active site cysteine. One group of authors has given it the acronym hapE, for hydrogen sulfide, alanine, and pyruvate producing enzyme, as hydropersulfides are readily reduced to produce hydrogen sulfide.

These enzymes belong to the family of transferases, specifically the sulfurtransferases, which transfer sulfur-containing groups. This function is critical for the assembly of iron-sulfur cluster-containing proteins. The systematic name of this enzyme class is L-cysteine:[enzyme cysteine] sulfurtransferase. These proteins are also known as cysteine desulfurylases.

Known cysteine desulfurases in prokaryotes include IscS (UniProt accession: P0A6B7), NifS (UniProt accession: P05341), and SufS (UniProt accession: P0A6B7). These are named after the corresponding iron-sulfur cluster assembly pathways: nitrogen fixation (NIF), iron-cluster assembly (ISC) and sulfur assimilation (SUF). All three proteins are very similar in structure, however SufS is mechanistically distinct from NifS and IscS. In the mitochondria of mammalian cells, NFS1 acts as the primary cysteine desulfurase.

== Function ==
Bacteria and mitochondria contain cysteine desulfurases to form iron sulfur clusters in proteins. However recently it has been shown that the enzyme, which produces hydrogen sulfide from cysteine, is also a virulence factor, namely for M.pneumoniae, in that it causes both α-hemolysis and β-haemolysis of red blood cells.

IscS participates in bacterial thiamine metabolism by transfer of its hydropersulfide sulfur to the sulfur carrier protein ThiS.

== Structural studies ==
As of late 2007, only one structure had been solved for this class of enzymes, with the PDB accession code PDB: 1T3I. Currently, there are structures for NifS, IscS, SufS, and NFS1 from various species, as well as structures with bound PLP and the hydropersulfide intermediate.
