= NDUFB9 =

Protein-coding gene in the species Homo sapiens

Identifiers
- Aliases: NDUFB9, B22, CI-B22, LYRM3, UQOR22, NADH:ubiquinone oxidoreductase subunit B9, MC1DN24
- External IDs: OMIM: 601445; MGI: 1913468; GeneCards: NDUFB9

Gene location (Human)
Chr.	Chromosome 8 (human)
Band	8q24.13	Start	124,539,101 bp
Band	8q24.13	End	124,580,648 bp

Gene location (Mouse)
Chr.	Chromosome 15 (mouse)
Band	15|15 D1	Start	58,805,605 bp
Band	15|15 D1	End	58,811,337 bp
RNA expression pattern
Bgee	Human / Mouse (ortholog); Top expressed in: myocardium of left ventricle; cardiac muscle tissue of right atrium; tibialis anterior muscle; quadriceps femoris muscle; mucosa of ileum; vastus lateralis muscle; body of tongue; deltoid muscle; right ventricle; lateral nuclear group of thalamus / Top expressed in: facial motor nucleus; Paneth cell; masseter muscle; aortic valve; digastric muscle; extraocular muscle; myocardium of ventricle; sternocleidomastoid muscle; temporal muscle; thoracic diaphragm; More reference expression data
BioGPS	n/a
Gene ontology
Molecular function	NADH dehydrogenase (ubiquinone) activity; protein binding
Cellular component	mitochondrial inner membrane; mitochondrial respiratory chain complex I; respirasome; membrane; mitochondrion
Biological process	hearing; mitochondrial electron transport, NADH to ubiquinone; mitochondrial respiratory chain complex I assembly
Sources:Amigo / QuickGO
Orthologs
Databases	NCBI: entry; OMA: entry
Species	Human	Mouse
Entrez	4715	66218
Ensembl	ENSG00000147684	ENSMUSG00000022354
UniProt	Q9Y6M9	Q9CQJ8
RefSeq (mRNA)	NM_005005; NM_001278645; NM_001278646; NM_001311168	NM_023172; NM_001364808
RefSeq (protein)	NP_001265574; NP_001265575; NP_001298097; NP_004996	NP_075661; NP_001351737
Location (UCSC)	Chr 8: 124.54 – 124.58 Mb	Chr 15: 58.81 – 58.81 Mb
PubMed search
- Wikidata
View/Edit Human	View/Edit Mouse

NADH dehydrogenase [ubiquinone] 1 beta subcomplex subunit 9 is an enzyme that in humans is encoded by the NDUFB9 gene. It belongs to the superfamily of LYRM proteins, which are characterized by a conserved leucine–tyrosine–arginine motif. NADH dehydrogenase (ubiquinone) 1 beta subcomplex subunit 9 is an accessory subunit of the NADH dehydrogenase (ubiquinone) complex, located in the mitochondrial inner membrane. It is also known as Complex I and is the largest of the five complexes of the electron transport chain.

== Structure ==
The NDUFB9 gene is located on the q arm of chromosome 8 in position 13.3 and is 10,884 base pairs long. The NDUFB9 protein weighs 22 kDa and is composed of 179 amino acids. NDUFB9 is a subunit of the enzyme NADH dehydrogenase (ubiquinone), the largest of the respiratory complexes. The structure is L-shaped with a long, hydrophobic transmembrane domain and a hydrophilic domain for the peripheral arm that includes all the known redox centers and the NADH binding site. It has been noted that the N-terminal hydrophobic domain has the potential to be folded into an alpha helix spanning the inner mitochondrial membrane with a C-terminal hydrophilic domain interacting with globular subunits of Complex I. The highly conserved two-domain structure suggests that this feature is critical for the protein function and that the hydrophobic domain acts as an anchor for the NADH dehydrogenase (ubiquinone) complex at the inner mitochondrial membrane.

== Function ==
The protein encoded by this gene is an accessory subunit of the multisubunit NADH:ubiquinone oxidoreductase (complex I) that is not directly involved in catalysis. Mammalian complex I is composed of 45 different subunits. It locates at the mitochondrial inner membrane. This protein complex has NADH dehydrogenase activity and oxidoreductase activity. It transfers electrons from NADH to the respiratory chain. The immediate electron acceptor for the enzyme is believed to be ubiquinone. Alternative splicing occurs at this locus and two transcript variants encoding distinct isoforms have been identified. Initially, NADH binds to Complex I and transfers two electrons to the isoalloxazine ring of the flavin mononucleotide (FMN) prosthetic arm to form FMNH_{2}. The electrons are transferred through a series of iron-sulfur (Fe-S) clusters in the prosthetic arm and finally to coenzyme Q10 (CoQ), which is reduced to ubiquinol (CoQH_{2}). The flow of electrons changes the redox state of the protein, resulting in a conformational change and pK shift of the ionizable side chain, which pumps four hydrogen ions out of the mitochondrial matrix.

== Clinical significance ==
A mutation in NDUFB9 resulting in reduction in NDUFB9 protein and both amount and activity of complex I has been shown to be a causal mutation leading to Complex I deficiency.
