= MALSU1 =

Protein-coding gene in the species Homo sapiens

Identifiers
- Aliases: MALSU1, C7orf30, mtRsfA, mitochondrial assembly of ribosomal large subunit 1
- External IDs: OMIM: 614624; MGI: 1922843; GeneCards: MALSU1

Gene location (Human)
Chr.	Chromosome 7 (human)
Band	7p15.3	Start	23,298,739 bp
Band	7p15.3	End	23,311,729 bp

Gene location (Mouse)
Chr.	Chromosome 6 (mouse)
Band	6 B2.3|6	Start	49,050,729 bp
Band	6 B2.3|6	End	49,063,685 bp
RNA expression pattern
Bgee	Human / Mouse (ortholog); Top expressed in: sperm; pancreatic epithelial cell; myocardium of left ventricle; cardiac muscle tissue of right atrium; deltoid muscle; retinal pigment epithelium; vastus lateralis muscle; tibialis anterior muscle; pancreatic ductal cell; germinal epithelium / Top expressed in: medial head of gastrocnemius muscle; quadriceps femoris muscle; vastus lateralis muscle; endocardial cushion; triceps brachii muscle; temporal muscle; sternocleidomastoid muscle; intercostal muscle; digastric muscle; thoracic diaphragm; More reference expression data
BioGPS	n/a
Gene ontology
Molecular function	ribosomal large subunit binding; protein binding
Cellular component	mitochondrial matrix; mitochondrion; cytosol; mitochondrial large ribosomal subunit
Biological process	ribosomal large subunit biogenesis; negative regulation of mitochondrial translation; negative regulation of ribosome biogenesis; negative regulation of translation; ribosome biogenesis
Sources:Amigo / QuickGO
Orthologs
Databases	NCBI: entry; OMA: entry
Species	Human	Mouse
Entrez	115416	75593
Ensembl	ENSG00000156928	ENSMUSG00000029815
UniProt	Q96EH3	Q9CWV0
RefSeq (mRNA)	NM_138446	NM_029353
RefSeq (protein)	NP_612455	NP_083629
Location (UCSC)	Chr 7: 23.3 – 23.31 Mb	Chr 6: 49.05 – 49.06 Mb
PubMed search
- Wikidata
View/Edit Human	View/Edit Mouse

Mitochondrial assembly of ribosomal large subunit protein 1 is a protein that in humans is encoded by the MALSU1 gene on chromosome 7. This protein localizes to mitochondria and is probably involved in mitochondrial translation or the biogenesis of the large subunit of the mitochondrial ribosome.

== Gene ==
C7ORF30 is located on chromosome 7 in humans and runs from 23,305,465 to 23,315,705. There are four predicted exons in the human gene with conservation occurring across most mammalian species. There is no conclusive data regarding whether the gene is ubiquitously expressed in human tissues, but expressed sequence tag databases show that it is expressed in many tissues.

=== Neighboring genes ===
MALSU1 is neighbored by GPNMB upstream and IGF2BP3 downstream, however the latter gene is transcribed on the opposite strand running from the 3' to the 5' end. There is some slight overlap of the untranslated regions of C7ORF30 and IGF2BP3 whereas the distance between C7ORF30 and GPNMB is 24,211 base pairs.

== Structure ==
MALSU1 is a member of the RsfS (ribosomal silencing factor, previously called DUF143) family of protein. which is highly conserved in both prokaryotes and eukaryotes but not archaea. Examples of mammalian conservation are given below using the ALIGN tool from the San Diego Supercomputer Center Biology Workbench. Percentages indicate the identity shared by the human protein and the respective mammalian protein. Accession numbers are from the NCBI database.

Species	Accession #	Identity
Macaca mulatta	XP_001098609	93.20%
Sus scrofa	NP_001092054	85.50%
Bos taurus	NP_001068866	88.50%
Canis familiaris	XP_853850	77.30%
Rattus norvegicus	NP_001100063	81.60%
Equus caballus	XP_001497879	90.70%

There are no known or predicted paralogs in Homo sapiens. That is, MALSU1 is a single-copy gene.

The domain is from position 93 to 194 on the human protein and comprises 43.2% of the sequence. This conserved domain is also present in the plant gene iojap, a pattern-striping gene in maize. However, since its function has been solved at least in bacteria, it is no longer a "domain of unknown function".

== Function ==
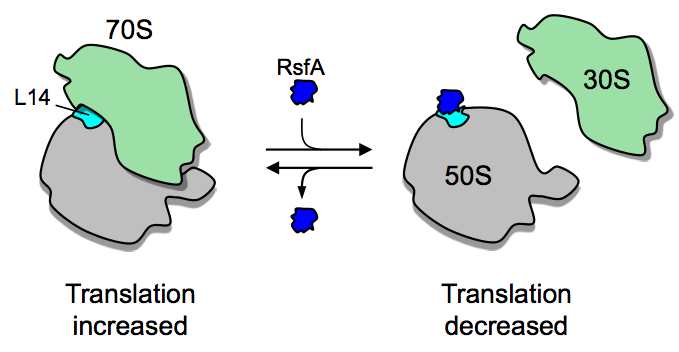
Mechanism of ribosomal subunit dissociation by RsfS (= RsfA)

While the function of the protein in mitochondria is not conclusive its bacterial homolog has been shown to silence bacterial translation by blocking the two ribosomal subunits from joining, hence it was called RsfS (= ribosomal silencing factor in starvation or stationary phase, a synonym of RsfA).

== Protein-protein interactions ==
RsfS has been shown via a yeast two-hybrid screen to interact with ribosomal protein L14 in four bacterial species as well as in mitochondria. MALSU1 was shown to interact with CHMP protein which is part of the ESCRT-III complex (Endosomal Sorting Complex Required for Transport). DUF143 has also been shown to interact with UFD1, tRNA synthetases class II, and Cytidylyltransferase in various architectures.
