= NDUFA6 =

Protein-coding gene in the species Homo sapiens

Identifiers
- Aliases: NDUFA6, B14, CI-B14, LYRM6, NADHB14, NADH:ubiquinone oxidoreductase subunit A6, MC1DN33
- External IDs: OMIM: 602138; MGI: 1914380; GeneCards: NDUFA6

Gene location (Human)
Chr.	Chromosome 22 (human)
Band	22q13.2	Start	42,085,526 bp
Band	22q13.2	End	42,090,884 bp

Gene location (Mouse)
Chr.	Chromosome 15 (mouse)
Band	15|15 E1	Start	82,234,341 bp
Band	15|15 E1	End	82,238,523 bp
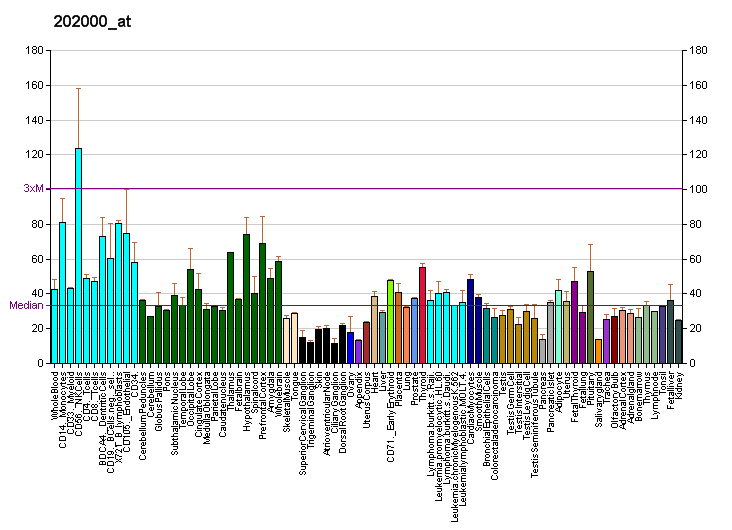

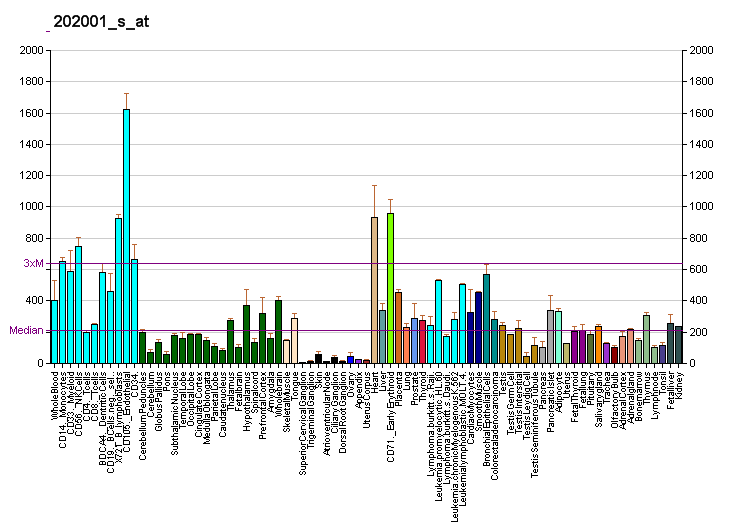
RNA expression pattern
Bgee	Human / Mouse (ortholog); Top expressed in: muscle of thigh; left ventricle; right auricle of heart; apex of heart; gastrocnemius muscle; skeletal muscle tissue; human kidney; mucosa of transverse colon; ganglionic eminence; renal cortex / Top expressed in: right kidney; facial motor nucleus; muscle of thigh; digastric muscle; proximal tubule; temporal muscle; intercostal muscle; sternocleidomastoid muscle; atrioventricular valve; triceps brachii muscle; More reference expression data
BioGPS	More reference expression data
Gene ontology
Molecular function	NADH dehydrogenase (ubiquinone) activity
Cellular component	mitochondrial inner membrane; mitochondrial respiratory chain complex I; respirasome; mitochondrial membranes; mitochondrion; membrane
Biological process	response to oxidative stress; mitochondrial respiratory chain complex I assembly; mitochondrial electron transport, NADH to ubiquinone
Sources:Amigo / QuickGO
Orthologs
Databases	NCBI: entry; OMA: entry
Species	Human	Mouse
Entrez	4700	67130
Ensembl	ENSG00000273397; ENSG00000184983; ENSG00000272765; ENSG00000281013; ENSG00000277365 n/a	ENSMUSG00000022450
UniProt	P56556	Q9CQZ5
RefSeq (mRNA)	NM_002490	NM_025987
RefSeq (protein)	NP_002481	NP_080263
Location (UCSC)	Chr 22: 42.09 – 42.09 Mb	Chr 15: 82.23 – 82.24 Mb
PubMed search
- Wikidata
View/Edit Human	View/Edit Mouse

NADH dehydrogenase [ubiquinone] 1 alpha subcomplex subunit 6 is an enzyme that in humans is encoded by the NDUFA6 gene. It belongs to the superfamily of LYRM proteins, which are characterized by a conserved leucine–tyrosine–arginine motif. The NDUFA6 protein is a subunit of NADH dehydrogenase (ubiquinone), which is located in the mitochondrial inner membrane and is the largest of the five complexes of the electron transport chain.

== Structure ==
The NDUFA6 gene is located on the q arm of chromosome 22 in position 13.2 and spans 5,359 base pairs. The gene produces an 18 kDa protein composed of 154 amino acids. NDUFA6 is a subunit of the enzyme NADH dehydrogenase (ubiquinone), the largest of the respiratory complexes. The structure is L-shaped with a long, hydrophobic transmembrane domain and a hydrophilic domain for the peripheral arm that includes all the known redox centers and the NADH binding site. It has been noted that the N-terminal hydrophobic domain has the potential to be folded into an alpha helix spanning the inner mitochondrial membrane with a C-terminal hydrophilic domain interacting with globular subunits of Complex I. The highly conserved two-domain structure suggests that this feature is critical for the protein function and that the hydrophobic domain acts as an anchor for the NADH dehydrogenase (ubiquinone) complex at the inner mitochondrial membrane. NDUFA6 is one of about 31 hydrophobic subunits that form the transmembrane region of Complex I. The predicted secondary structure is primarily alpha helix, but the carboxy-terminal half of the protein has high potential to adopt a coiled-coil form. The amino-terminal part contains a putative beta sheet rich in hydrophobic amino acids that may serve as mitochondrial import signal. Related pseudogenes have also been identified on four other chromosomes.

== Function ==
The human NDUFA6 gene codes for a subunit of Complex I of the respiratory chain, which transfers electrons from NADH to ubiquinone. Initially, NADH binds to Complex I and transfers two electrons to the isoalloxazine ring of the flavin mononucleotide (FMN) prosthetic arm to form FMNH_{2}. The electrons are transferred through a series of iron-sulfur (Fe-S) clusters in the prosthetic arm and finally to coenzyme Q10 (CoQ), which is reduced to ubiquinol (CoQH_{2}). The flow of electrons changes the redox state of the protein, resulting in a conformational change and pK shift of the ionizable side chain, which pumps four hydrogen ions out of the mitochondrial matrix.
