= NFS1 =

Protein-coding gene in the species humans Homo sapiens

Identifiers
- Aliases: NFS1, IscS, NIFS, HUSSY-08, NFS1 cysteine desulfurase, cysteine desulfurase, COXPD52
- External IDs: OMIM: 603485; MGI: 1316706; GeneCards: NFS1
Enzyme activity
EC #	BRENDA	ExPASy	KEGG	MetaCyc
2.8.1.7	↗	↗	↗	↗

Gene location (Human)
Chr.	Chromosome 20 (human)
Band	20q11.22	Start	35,668,052 bp
Band	20q11.22	End	35,699,355 bp

Gene location (Mouse)
Chr.	Chromosome 2 (mouse)
Band	2|2 H1	Start	155,965,559 bp
Band	2|2 H1	End	155,986,106 bp
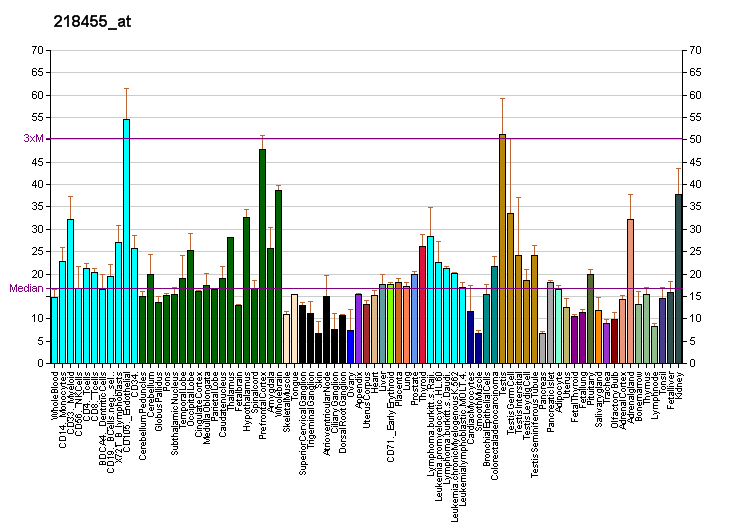
RNA expression pattern
Bgee	Human / Mouse (ortholog); Top expressed in: right adrenal cortex; left adrenal gland; left adrenal cortex; right lobe of liver; apex of heart; right testis; left testis; mucosa of transverse colon; right frontal lobe; anterior cingulate cortex / Top expressed in: right kidney; sternocleidomastoid muscle; digastric muscle; temporal muscle; triceps brachii muscle; muscle of thigh; saccule; human kidney; otic placode; proximal tubule; More reference expression data
BioGPS	More reference expression data
Gene ontology
Molecular function	transferase activity; protein homodimerization activity; iron-sulfur cluster binding; metal ion binding; protein binding; catalytic activity; pyridoxal phosphate binding; cysteine desulfurase activity
Cellular component	cytosol; nucleoplasm; nucleus; cytoplasm; mitochondrion; mitochondrial matrix
Biological process	molybdopterin cofactor biosynthetic process; [2Fe-2S cluster assembly]; Mo-molybdopterin cofactor biosynthetic process; sulfur amino acid metabolic process; small molecule metabolic process; iron incorporation into metallo-sulfur cluster; protein-containing complex assembly; iron-sulfur cluster assembly
Sources:Amigo / QuickGO
Orthologs
Databases	NCBI: entry; OMA: entry
Species	Human	Mouse
Entrez	9054	18041
Ensembl	ENSG00000244005	ENSMUSG00000027618
UniProt	Q9Y697	Q9Z1J3
RefSeq (mRNA)	NM_001198989; NM_021100; NM_181679	NM_010911
RefSeq (protein)	NP_001185918; NP_066923	NP_035041
Location (UCSC)	Chr 20: 35.67 – 35.7 Mb	Chr 2: 155.97 – 155.99 Mb
PubMed search
- Wikidata
View/Edit Human	View/Edit Mouse

Cysteine desulfurase, mitochondrial is an enzyme that in humans is encoded by the NFS1 gene.

Iron-sulfur clusters are required for the function of many cellular enzymes. The protein encoded by this gene supplies inorganic sulfur to these clusters by removing the sulfur from cysteine, creating alanine and a protein-bound hydropersulfide in the process. The terminal sulfur atom of the hydropersulfide is transferred to the iron-sulfur cluster scaffold protein ISCU, mediated by the accessory protein frataxin.

This gene uses alternate in-frame translation initiation sites to generate mitochondrial forms and cytoplasmic/nuclear forms. Selection of the alternative initiation sites is determined by the cytosolic pH. The encoded protein belongs to the class-V family of pyridoxal phosphate-dependent aminotransferases.
