= Iron–sulfur cluster =

Inorganic cofactor

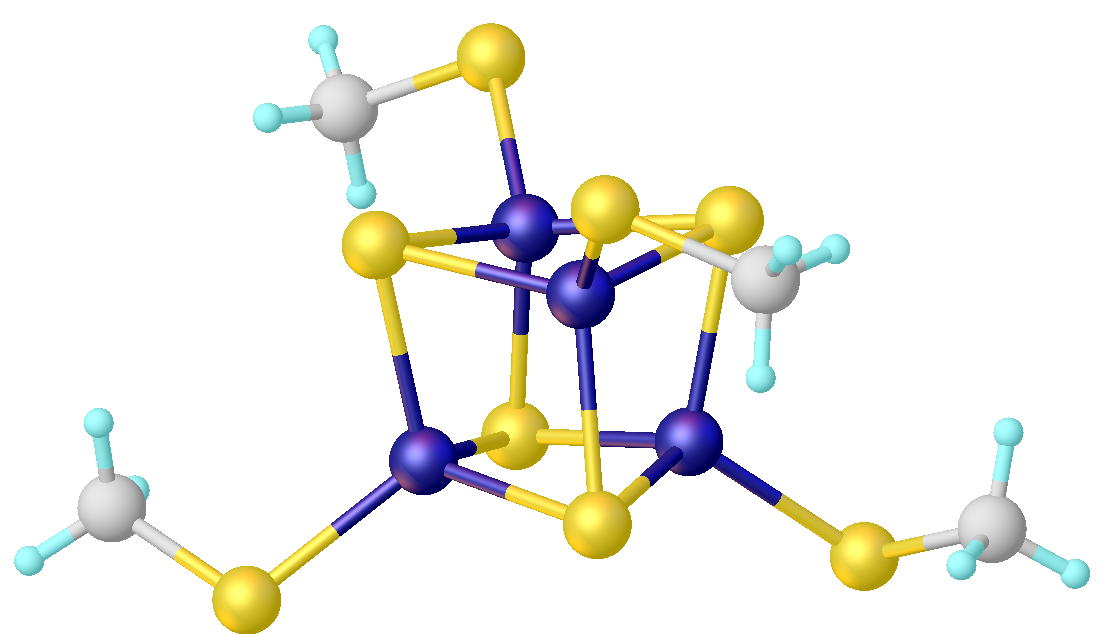
Structure of [Fe_{4}S_{4}(SMe)_{4}]^{2−}, a synthetic analogue of 4Fe–4S cofactors.

Iron–sulfur clusters are molecular ensembles of iron and sulfide. They are most often discussed in the context of the biological role for iron–sulfur proteins, which are pervasive. Many Fe–S clusters are known in the area of organometallic chemistry and as precursors to synthetic analogues of the biological clusters. It is supposed that the last universal common ancestor had many iron-sulfur clusters.

== In biology ==
Iron–sulfur clusters occur in many biological systems, often as components of electron transfer proteins. The ferredoxin proteins are the most common Fe–S proteins in nature. They feature either 2Fe–2S or 4Fe–4S centers. They occur in all branches of life.

Fe–S clusters can be classified according to their Fe:S stoichiometry [2Fe–2S], [4Fe–3S], [3Fe–4S], and [4Fe–4S]. The [4Fe–4S] clusters occur in two forms: normal ferredoxins and high potential iron proteins (HiPIP). Both adopt cuboidal structures, but they utilize different oxidation states. They are found in all forms of life.

The relevant redox couple in all Fe–S proteins is Fe(II)/Fe(III).

Many clusters have been synthesized in the laboratory with the formula [Fe_{4}S_{4}(SR)_{4}]^{2−}, which are known for many R substituents, and with many cations. Variations have been prepared including the incomplete cubanes [Fe_{3}S_{4}(SR)_{3}]^{3−}.

== Synthetic Fe–S clusters ==
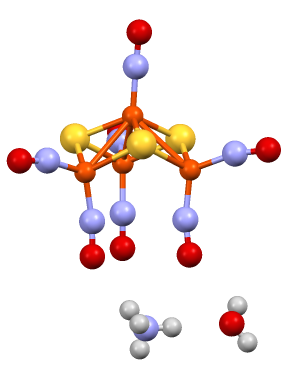
Structure of the hydrated ammonium salt of [Fe_{4}S_{3}(NO)_{7}]^{−}.

Synthetic Fe–S clusters are laboratory-prepared coordination compounds or chains, often designed to mimic the structural, electronic, or chemical properties of biological Fe–S clusters.

Roussin's black anion, [Fe_{4}S_{3}(NO)_{7}]^{−}, described in 1858, is the first synthetic Fe-S cluster. It has the geometry of an incomplete cubane-type cluster with C_{3v} symmetry. The dark color of the complex is attributed to a number of charge-transfer interactions. Since the 1970s, many of these Fe-S clusters have been described. A key property of Fe–S clusters is their ability to undergo redox.

=== Organometallic clusters ===
Organometallic Fe–S clusters include the sulfido carbonyls with the formula Fe_{2}S_{2}(CO)_{6}, H_{2}Fe_{3}S(CO)_{9}, and Fe_{3}S_{2}(CO)_{9}. Compounds are also known that incorporate cyclopentadienyl ligands, such as (C_{5}H_{5})_{4}Fe_{4}S_{4}.

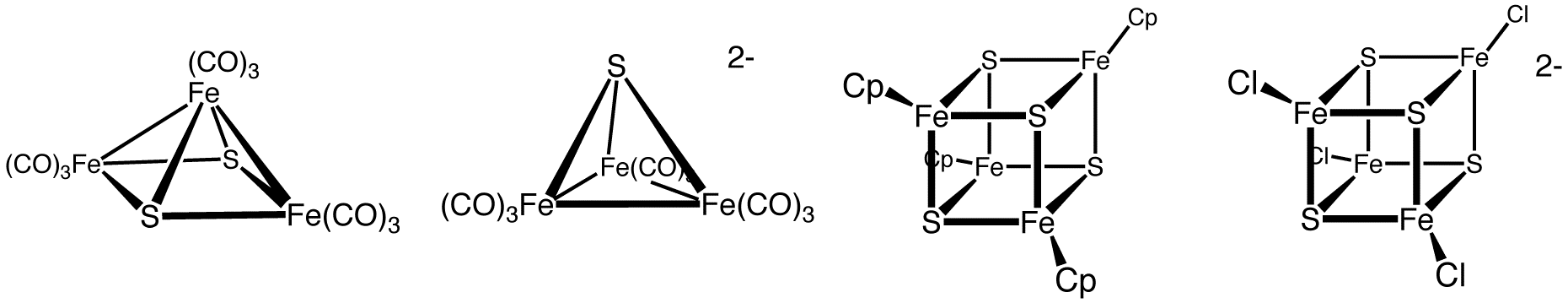
Figure. Illustrative synthetic Fe–S clusters. From left to right: Fe_{3}S_{2}(CO)_{9}, [Fe_{3}S(CO)_{9}]^{2−}, (C_{5}H_{5})_{4}Fe_{4}S_{4}, and [Fe_{4}S_{4}Cl_{4}]^{2−}.

=== Inorganic materials ===
Structure of potassium dithioferrate, which features infinite chains of Fe(III) centers

=== In maquettes and artificial proteins ===
It is possible to incorporate Fe–S clusters into maquettes (smaller minimal functional proteins designed from biological proteins) and artificial proteins, often abbreviated to MAPs. The first examples of Fe–S MAPs emerged in the early 1970s, as a means to mimic naturally occurring iron-containing proteins like rubredoxins. These contained [Fe(S-Cys)_{4}] motifs. Further research into [4Fe–4S] MAPs has led to the development of ambidoxins: de novo maquettes that consist of 12 residues with the sequence X-Cys-X_{2}-Cys-X_{2}-Cys-X_{2}-Cys-X (X = Arg, Lys), which can successfully perform hundreds of redox cycles. However, Fe–S MAPs are limited by their lower solubility and exposed Fe–S cluster core that is susceptible to degradation by solvents.

== See also ==
- Bioinorganic chemistry
- Ligand (biochemistry)
- Iron-binding proteins
- Biometal (biology)
- FeMoco
