= SDHD =

Protein found in humans

Identifiers
- Aliases: SDHD, CBT1, CII-4, CWS3, PGL, PGL1, QPs3, SDH4, cybS, succinate dehydrogenase complex subunit D, MC2DN3
- External IDs: OMIM: 602690; MGI: 1914175; GeneCards: SDHD

Gene location (Human)
Chr.	Chromosome 11 (human)
Band	11q23.1	Start	112,086,824 bp
Band	11q23.1	End	112,120,016 bp

Gene location (Mouse)
Chr.	Chromosome 9 (mouse)
Band	9|9 A5.3	Start	50,507,657 bp
Band	9|9 A5.3	End	50,515,112 bp
RNA expression pattern
Bgee	Human / Mouse (ortholog); Top expressed in: jejunal mucosa; rectum; kidney tubule; biceps brachii; mucosa of colon; right ventricle; mucosa of sigmoid colon; mucosa of transverse colon; Skeletal muscle tissue of biceps brachii; Skeletal muscle tissue of rectus abdominis / Top expressed in: right kidney; interventricular septum; extraocular muscle; myocardium of ventricle; intercostal muscle; cardiac muscles; digastric muscle; cardiac muscle tissue of left ventricle; thoracic diaphragm; sternocleidomastoid muscle; More reference expression data
BioGPS	n/a
Gene ontology
Molecular function	electron transfer activity; succinate dehydrogenase activity; metal ion binding; succinate dehydrogenase (ubiquinone) activity; heme binding; ubiquinone binding
Cellular component	integral component of membrane; mitochondrial inner membrane; mitochondrial envelope; mitochondrion; membrane; mitochondrial respiratory chain complex II, succinate dehydrogenase complex (ubiquinone)
Biological process	tricarboxylic acid cycle; mitochondrial electron transport, succinate to ubiquinone
Sources:Amigo / QuickGO
Orthologs
Databases	NCBI: entry; OMA: entry
Species	Human	Mouse
Entrez	6392	66925
Ensembl	ENSG00000204370	ENSMUSG00000000171
UniProt	O14521	Q9CXV1
RefSeq (mRNA)	NM_001276503; NM_001276504; NM_001276506; NM_003002	NM_025848
RefSeq (protein)	NP_001263432; NP_001263433; NP_001263435; NP_002993	NP_080124
Location (UCSC)	Chr 11: 112.09 – 112.12 Mb	Chr 9: 50.51 – 50.52 Mb
PubMed search
- Wikidata
View/Edit Human	View/Edit Mouse

Succinate dehydrogenase [ubiquinone] cytochrome b small subunit, mitochondrial (CybS), also known as succinate dehydrogenase complex subunit D (SDHD), is a protein that in humans is encoded by the SDHD gene. Names previously used for SDHD were PGL and PGL1. Succinate dehydrogenase is an important enzyme in both the citric acid cycle and the electron transport chain. Hereditary PGL-PCC syndrome is caused by a parental imprint of the SDHD gene. Screening can begin by 6 years of age.

== Structure ==
The SDHD gene is located on chromosome 11 at locus 11q23 and it spans 8,978 base pairs. There are pseudogenes for this gene on chromosomes 1, 2, 3, 7, and 18. The SDHD gene produces a 17 kDa protein composed of 159 amino acids.

The SDHD protein is one of the two integral transmembrane subunits anchoring the four-subunit succinate dehydrogenase (Complex II) protein complex to the matrix side of the mitochondrial inner membrane. The other transmembrane subunit is SDHC. The SDHC/SDHD dimer is connected to the SDHB electron transport subunit which, in turn, is connected to the SDHA subunit.

== Function ==
SDHD forms part of the transmembrane protein dimer with SDHC that anchors Complex II to the inner mitochondrial membrane. The SDHC/SDHD dimer provides binding sites for ubiquinone and water during electron transport at Complex II. Initially, SDHA oxidizes succinate via deprotonation at the FAD binding site, leaving fumarate, loosely bound to the active site, free to exit the protein. The electrons derived from succinate tunnel along the [Fe-S] relay in the SDHB subunit until they reach the [3Fe-4S] iron–sulfur cluster. The electrons are then transferred to an awaiting ubiquinone molecule at the active site in the SDHC/SDHD dimer. The O1 carbonyl oxygen of ubiquinone is oriented at the active site (image 4) by hydrogen bond interactions with Tyr83 of SDHD. The presence of electrons in the [3Fe-4S] iron sulphur cluster induces the movement of ubiquinone into a second orientation. This facilitates a second hydrogen bond interaction between the O4 carbonyl group of ubiquinone and Ser27 of subunit C. Following the first single electron reduction step, a semiquinone radical species is formed. The second electron arrives from the [3Fe-4S] cluster to provide full reduction of the ubiquinone to ubiquinol.

== Clinical significance ==
Mutations in the SDHD gene can cause familial paraganglioma. Germline mutations in SDHD were first linked to hereditary paraganglioma in 2000. Since then, it has been shown that mutations in SDHB and to a lesser degree SDHC can cause paranglioma as well as familial pheochromocytoma. Notably, the tumor spectrum is different for the different mutations. SDHB mutations often lead to metastatic disease that is extra-adrenal, while SDHD mutation related tumors are more typically benign, originating in the head and neck.

The exact mechanism for tumorigenesis is not determined, but it is suspected that malfunction of the SDH complex can cause a hypoxic response in the cell that leads to tumor formation. Mutations in the SDHB, SDHC, SDHD, and SDHAF2 genes lead to the loss or reduction of SDH enzyme activity. Because the mutated SDH enzyme cannot convert succinate to fumarate, succinate accumulates in the cell. As a result, the hypoxia pathways are triggered in normal oxygen conditions, which lead to abnormal cell growth and tumor formation. People living at higher altitudes (for example, the Andes mountains) are known to have an increased rate of benign paraganglioma, with the rate of disease increasing with the altitude of the population.

At least five variants in the SDHD gene have been identified in people with Cowden syndrome or a similar disorder called Cowden-like syndrome. These conditions are characterized by multiple tumor-like growths called hamartomas and an increased risk of developing certain cancers. When Cowden syndrome and Cowden-like syndrome are caused by SDHD gene mutations, the conditions are associated with a particularly high risk of developing breast and thyroid cancers. The SDHD gene variants associated with Cowden syndrome and Cowden-like syndrome change single amino acids in the SDHD protein, which likely alters the function of the SDH enzyme. Studies suggest that the defective enzyme could allow cells to grow and divide unchecked, leading to the formation of hamartomas and cancerous tumors. However, researchers are uncertain whether the identified SDHD gene variants are directly associated with Cowden syndrome and Cowden-like syndrome. Some of the variants described above have rarely been found in people without the features of these conditions.

Mutations in the SDHD gene have been found in a small number of people with Carney–Stratakis syndrome, a hereditary form of a cancer of the gastrointestinal tract called gastrointestinal stromal tumor (GIST). Those with Carney-Stratakis syndrome present with a noncancerous tumor associated with the nervous system called a paraganglioma or pheochromocytoma (a type of paraganglioma). An inherited SDHD gene mutation predisposes an individual to cancer formation. An additional mutation that deletes the normal copy of the gene is needed to cause Carney-Stratakis syndrome. This second mutation, called a somatic mutation, is acquired during a person's lifetime and is present only in tumor cells.

Mitochondrial complex II deficiency (MT-C2D), a disorder of the mitochondrial respiratory chain with heterogeneous clinical manifestations, has also been associated with mutations in the SDHD gene. Clinical features include psychomotor regression in infants, poor growth with lack of speech development, severe spastic quadriplegia, dystonia, progressive leukoencephalopathy, muscle weakness, exercise intolerance, cardiomyopathy. Some patients manifest Leigh syndrome or Kearns–Sayre syndrome.

== Interactive pathway map ==
Click on genes, proteins and metabolites below to link to respective articles. (Note: The interactive pathway map can be edited at WikiPathways: "TCACycle_WP78".)

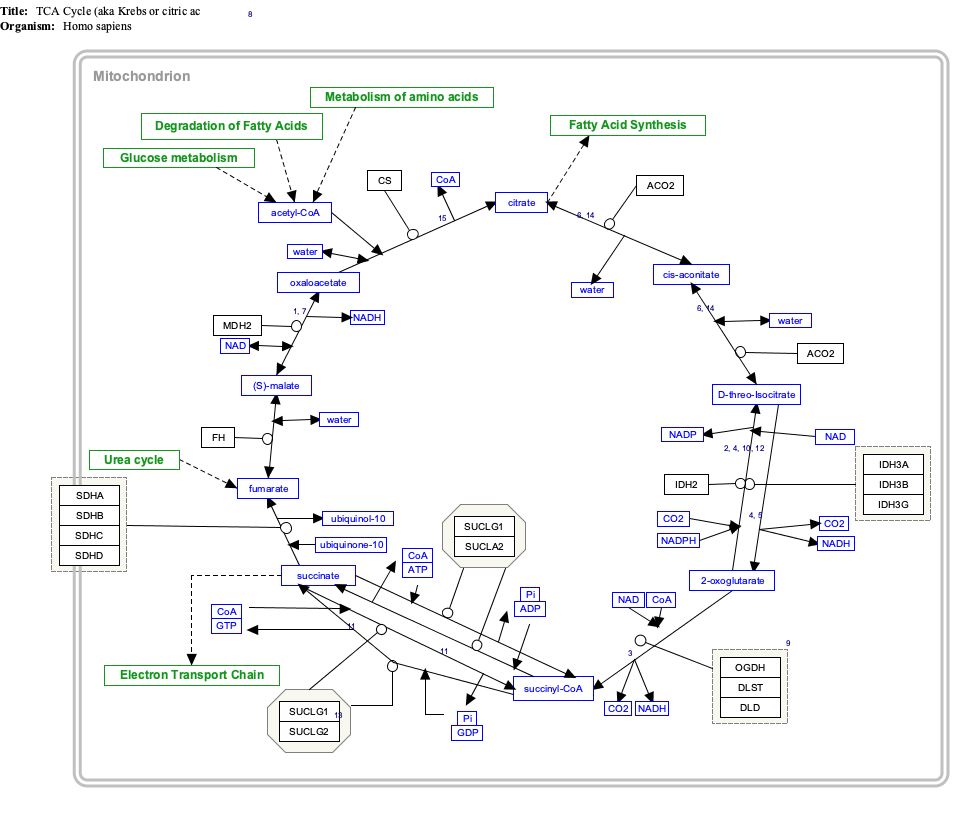

TCACycle_WP78 edit
