= Succinate dehydrogenase complex subunit C =

Protein found in humans

SDHC
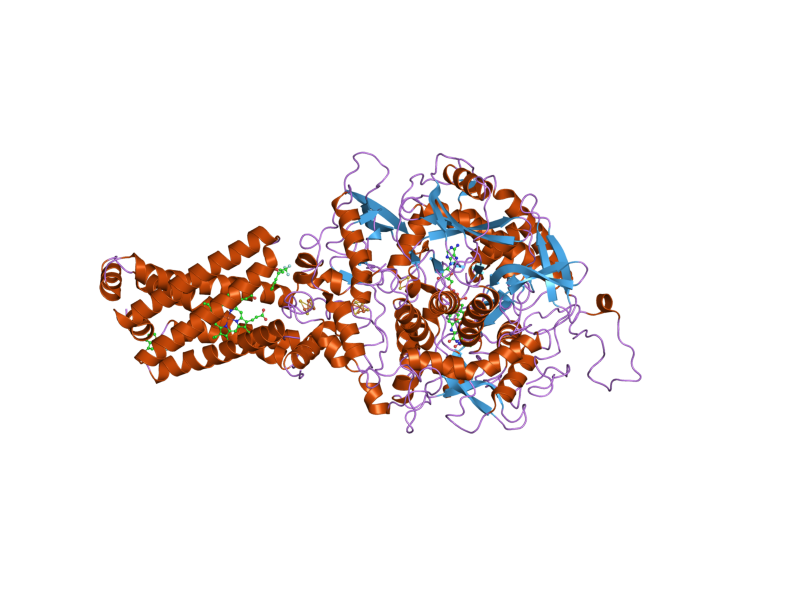

Identifiers
- Aliases: SDHC, CYB560, CYBL, PGL3, QPS1, SDH3, succinate dehydrogenase complex subunit C
- External IDs: OMIM: 602413; MGI: 1913302; GeneCards: SDHC

Gene location (Human)
Chr.	Chromosome 1 (human)
Band	1q23.3	Start	161,314,381 bp
Band	1q23.3	End	161,363,206 bp

Gene location (Mouse)
Chr.	Chromosome 1 (mouse)
Band	1|1 H3	Start	170,954,734 bp
Band	1|1 H3	End	170,978,172 bp
RNA expression pattern
Bgee	Human / Mouse (ortholog); Top expressed in: islet of Langerhans; right adrenal cortex; human kidney; left adrenal gland; left adrenal cortex; rectum; smooth muscle tissue; duodenum; left ventricle; right lobe of liver / Top expressed in: soleus muscle; interventricular septum; plantaris muscle; atrium; muscle of thigh; myocardium of ventricle; digastric muscle; sternocleidomastoid muscle; extensor digitorum longus muscle; temporal muscle; More reference expression data
BioGPS	n/a
Gene ontology
Molecular function	electron transfer activity; oxidoreductase activity, acting on the CH-CH group of donors; succinate dehydrogenase activity; heme binding; metal ion binding; succinate dehydrogenase (ubiquinone) activity; ubiquinone binding
Cellular component	integral component of membrane; mitochondrial inner membrane; respiratory chain complex II; succinate dehydrogenase complex; mitochondrion; membrane; mitochondrial respiratory chain complex II, succinate dehydrogenase complex (ubiquinone)
Biological process	aerobic dissimilation; tricarboxylic acid cycle; mitochondrial electron transport, succinate to ubiquinone; response to oxidative stress
Sources:Amigo / QuickGO
Orthologs
Databases	NCBI: entry; OMA: entry
Species	Human	Mouse
Entrez	6391	66052
Ensembl	ENSG00000143252	ENSMUSG00000058076
UniProt	Q99643	Q9CZB0
RefSeq (mRNA)	NM_001035511; NM_001035512; NM_001035513; NM_001278172; NM_003001	NM_025321
RefSeq (protein)	NP_001030588; NP_001030589; NP_001030590; NP_001265101; NP_002992	NP_079597
Location (UCSC)	Chr 1: 161.31 – 161.36 Mb	Chr 1: 170.95 – 170.98 Mb
PubMed search
- Wikidata
View/Edit Human	View/Edit Mouse

Succinate dehydrogenase complex subunit C, also known as succinate dehydrogenase cytochrome b560 subunit, mitochondrial, is a protein that in humans is encoded by the SDHC gene. This gene encodes one of four nuclear-encoded subunits that comprise succinate dehydrogenase, also known as mitochondrial complex II, a key enzyme complex of the tricarboxylic acid cycle and aerobic respiratory chains of mitochondria. The encoded protein is one of two integral membrane proteins that anchor other subunits of the complex, which form the catalytic core, to the inner mitochondrial membrane. There are several related pseudogenes for this gene on different chromosomes. Mutations in this gene have been associated with pheochromocytomas and paragangliomas. Alternatively spliced transcript variants have been described.

== Structure ==
The gene that codes for the SDHC protein is nuclear, even though the protein is located in the inner membrane of the mitochondria. The location of the gene in humans is on the first chromosome at q21. The gene is partitioned in six exons. The SDHC gene produces an 18.6 kDa protein composed of 169 amino acids.

The SDHC protein is one of the two transmembrane subunits of the four-subunit succinate dehydrogenase (Complex II) protein complex that resides in the inner mitochondrial membrane. The other transmembrane subunit is SDHD. The SDHC/SDHD dimer is connected to the SDHB electron transport subunit which, in turn, is connected to the SDHA subunit.

== Function ==

The SDHC protein is one of four nuclear-encoded subunits that comprise succinate dehydrogenase, also known as Complex II of the electron transport chain, a key enzyme complex of the citric acid cycle and aerobic respiratory chains of mitochondria. The encoded protein is one of two integral membrane proteins that anchor other subunits of the complex, which form the catalytic core, to the inner mitochondrial membrane.

SDHC forms part of the transmembrane protein dimer with SDHD that anchors Complex II to the inner mitochondrial membrane. The SDHC/SDHD dimer provides binding sites for ubiquinone and water during electron transport at Complex II. Initially, SDHA oxidizes succinate via deprotonation at the FAD binding site, forming FADH_{2} and leaving fumarate, loosely bound to the active site, free to exit the protein. The electrons derived from succinate tunnel along the [Fe-S] relay in the SDHB subunit until they reach the [3Fe-4S] iron sulfur cluster. The electrons are then transferred to an awaiting ubiquinone molecule at the Q pool active site in the SDHC/SDHD dimer. The O1 carbonyl oxygen of ubiquinone is oriented at the active site (image 4) by hydrogen bond interactions with Tyr83 of SDHD. The presence of electrons in the [3Fe-4S] iron sulphur cluster induces the movement of ubiquinone into a second orientation. This facilitates a second hydrogen bond interaction between the O4 carbonyl group of ubiquinone and Ser27 of SDHC. Following the first single electron reduction step, a semiquinone radical species is formed. The second electron arrives from the [3Fe-4S] cluster to provide full reduction of the ubiquinone to ubiquinol.

== Clinical significance ==
Mutations in this gene have been associated with paragangliomas. More than 30 mutations in the SDHC gene have been found to increase the risk of hereditary paraganglioma-pheochromocytoma type 3. People with this condition have paragangliomas, pheochromocytomas, or both. An inherited SDHC gene mutation predisposes an individual to the condition, and a somatic mutation that deletes the normal copy of the SDHC gene is needed to cause hereditary paraganglioma-pheochromocytoma type 3. Most of the inherited SDHC gene mutations change single amino acids in the SDHC protein sequence or result in a shortened protein. As a result, there is little or no SDH enzyme activity. Because the mutated SDH enzyme cannot convert succinate to fumarate, succinate accumulates in the cell. The excess succinate abnormally stabilizes hypoxia-inducible factors (HIF), which also builds up in cells. Excess HIF stimulates cells to divide and triggers the production of blood vessels when they are not needed. Rapid and uncontrolled cell division, along with the formation of new blood vessels, can lead to the development of tumors in people with hereditary paraganglioma-pheochromocytoma.

== Interactive pathway map ==
Click on genes, proteins and metabolites below to link to respective articles. (Note: The interactive pathway map can be edited at WikiPathways: "TCACycle_WP78".)

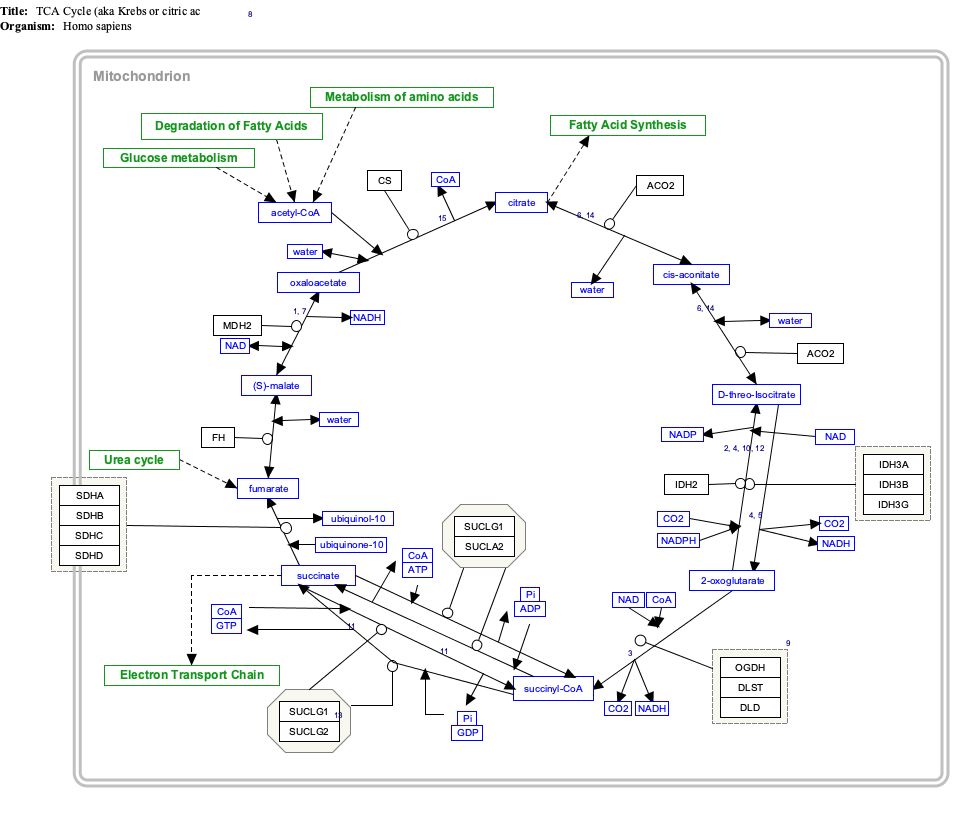

TCACycle_WP78 edit
