= Mitochondrial complex II deficiency =

- Mitochondrial complex II
- Specialty: Neurology

Mitochondrial complex II deficiency, also called CII deficiency, is a rare mitochondrial disease caused by deficiency of mitochondrial complex II, also known as Succinate dehydrogenase (SDH). SDH plays a key role in metabolism; the catalytic end, made up of SDHA and SDHB oxidizes succinate to fumarate in the tricarboxylic acid (TCA) cycle. The electrons from this reaction then reduce FAD to FADH2, which ultimately reduces ubiquinone to ubiquinol in the mitochondrial electron transport chain. As of 2020, about 61 cases have been reported with genetic studies, but there are also documented cases of CII deficiencies as determined by biochemical and histological analysis without genetic studies.

== Signs and symptoms ==
Mitochondrial complex II deficiency affects the body's mitochondria and can have a variety of presentations. In some cases, the brain, peripheral nervous system, heart, liver, kidneys, and muscles are affected, while in other cases, only a subset of these organs are affected. The condition can present differently among different individuals, even those in the same family, but symptoms can largely be separated into two categories. Those with biallelic loss of function who don't have any functional SDH have an average age of onset of 8.6 ± 7.9 months, while those with monoallelic loss of function have an average age of onset of 21.5 ± 20.3 years. In the biallelic form, there is typically a Leigh syndrome phenotype with symptoms including seizures, white matter lesions, nystagmus, developmental delay, microcephaly, leukodystrophy, hypertonia, multiorgan failure, spasticity, tetraparesis, and more. In the monallelic form, often caused by heterozygous mutations of SDHA, symptoms include exercise intolerance, rhabdomyolosis, muscle pain, dyspnea, hypertension, dilated cardiomyopathy, hypertrophic cardiomyopathy, and optic atrophy.

== Causes ==
CII deficiency is a genetic disorder caused by Nuclear DNA (as opposed to mitochondrial DNA) and has both autosomal recessive and dominant inheritance patterns. Most pathogenic mutations for CII deficiency occur on SDHA or SDHAF1, but other pathogenic mutations for CII are known for SDHB and SDHD. SDHA is the only SDHx gene reported to date in which a dominant pathogenic variant has been identified, although most affected individuals harbour either homozygous or compound heterozygous pathogenic variants.

For unknown reasons, several cases of CII deficiency have been linked to Umeå, Sweden.

== Diagnosis ==
The most effective way to diagnose CII deficiency is by measuring the activity of complex II in muscle biopsy, however, there is no clear correlation between residual complex II activity and severity or clinical outcome. Other diagnostic tests include brain MRIs, which can detect symptoms characteristic of leigh syndrome, electromyography (EMG), which can detect myopathies, and blood tests for biochemical signals of mitochondrial dysfunction.

== Prognosis ==
The prognosis can vary wildly for CII deficiency: In those who present earlier, the prognosis is worse, and especially for the biallelic form, few reach the age of 4. Those presenting with Leigh syndrome or greater neurological involvement have worse outcomes. In severe cases where multiple organ systems are affected, death can occur in early life due to multisystem failure.

There is no cure for CII deficiency, though some reported patients showed clinical improvement following riboflavin therapy, a vitamin essential for mitochondrial function. Vitamins, such as the other B vitamins and Coenzyme Q-10, have been used with little success, and treatments primarily focus on symptoms, such as sodium bicarbonate for managing acidosis and opthamological procedures for correcting eyesight.

== Epidemiology ==
CII deficiency is extremely rare, with less than 100 documented cases worldwide. Most cases recorded in literature are due to the biallelic form, and these are most common for those whose parents are consanguineous. There are potentially more cases of the monallelic form, but possibly due to their less severe nature or less unique presentation, they may not be reported as frequently. As human mitochondrial diseases and the effects of herbicides and fungicides on the mitochondria are a current area of research, our understanding of CII deficiency may progress significantly.
