= SDHAF1 =

Protein-coding gene in the species Homo sapiens

Identifiers
- Aliases: SDHAF1, LYRM8, succinate dehydrogenase complex assembly factor 1, MC2DN2
- External IDs: OMIM: 612848; MGI: 1915582; GeneCards: SDHAF1

Gene location (Human)
Chr.	Chromosome 19 (human)
Band	19q13.12	Start	35,995,188 bp
Band	19q13.12	End	35,996,312 bp

Gene location (Mouse)
Chr.	Chromosome 7 (mouse)
Band	7|7 B1	Start	30,020,831 bp
Band	7|7 B1	End	30,023,320 bp
RNA expression pattern
Bgee	Human / Mouse (ortholog); Top expressed in: beta cell; parotid gland; mucosa of transverse colon; lateral nuclear group of thalamus; vena cava; pars reticulata; middle temporal gyrus; external globus pallidus; pars compacta; prefrontal cortex / Top expressed in: Ileal epithelium; cardiac muscle tissue of left ventricle; interventricular septum; extraocular muscle; plantaris muscle; extensor digitorum longus muscle; internal carotid artery; external carotid artery; ascending aorta; lacrimal gland; More reference expression data
BioGPS	n/a
Gene ontology
Molecular function	protein binding
Cellular component	mitochondrion; mitochondrial matrix
Biological process	mitochondrial respiratory chain complex II assembly
Sources:Amigo / QuickGO
Orthologs
Databases	NCBI: entry; OMA: entry
Species	Human	Mouse
Entrez	644096	68332
Ensembl	ENSG00000205138	ENSMUSG00000074211
UniProt	A6NFY7	Q3U276
RefSeq (mRNA)	NM_001042631	NM_001033140
RefSeq (protein)	NP_001036096	NP_001028312
Location (UCSC)	Chr 19: 36 – 36 Mb	Chr 7: 30.02 – 30.02 Mb
PubMed search
- Wikidata
View/Edit Human	View/Edit Mouse

Succinate dehydrogenase complex assembly factor 1 (SDHAF1), also known as LYR motif-containing protein 8 (LYRM8), is a protein that, in humans, is encoded by the SDHAF1, or LYRM8, gene. It belongs to the superfamily of LYRM proteins, which are characterized by a conserved leucine–tyrosine–arginine motif. SDHAF1 is a chaperone protein involved in the assembly of the succinate dehydrogenase (SDH) complex (complex II). Mutations in this gene are associated with SDH-defective infantile leukoencephalopathy and mitochondrial complex II deficiency.

== Structure ==
SDHAF1 is located on the q arm of chromosome 19 in position 13.12 and has 1 exon. The SDHAF1 gene produces a 12.8 kDa protein composed of 115 amino acids. SDHAF1 is ubiquitously expressed and belongs to the complex I LYR family and SDHAF1 subfamily. As such, SDHAF1 is one of at least eight proteins that has a LYR tripeptide motif, thought to be important for Fe-S metabolism. SDHAF1 also contains an N-terminal mitochondrial targeting sequence that does not get cleaved following import into the mitochondria. The encoded protein is fairly hydrophilic and does not contain a transmembrane domain.

== Function ==
SDHAF1 is essential for the assembly of the succinate dehydrogenase (SDH) complex (complex II), an enzyme complex that is a component of both the tricarboxylic acid (TCA) cycle and the mitochondrial electron transport chain, and which couples the oxidation of succinate to fumarate with the reduction of ubiquinone (coenzyme Q) to ubiquinol. The succinate dehydrogenase (SDH) complex of the mitochondrial respiratory chain is composed of 4 individual subunits. The protein encoded by the SDHAF1 gene resides in the mitochondria, and is essential for SDH assembly, but does not physically associate with the complex in vivo. Specifically, SDHAF1 mediates and promotes the maturation of the SDHB subunit of the SDH catalytic dimer. The iron-sulfur (Fe-S) protein subunit SDHB is required for functional succinate dehydrogenase. By protecting SDHB from damaging oxidants, SDHAF1 plays a vital role in the assembly and stability of succinate dehydrogenase (SDH). Alternatively, SDHAF1 may facilitate Fe-S cluster acquisition by SDHB by directly binding to the co-chaperone HSC20, which is an essential component of the Fe-S biogenesis machinery that facilitates transfer of the Fe-S prosthetic group from the main scaffold protein ISCU to recipient apo-proteins (i.e. SDHB),

== Clinical significance ==
Variants of SDHAF1 have been associated with mitochondrial complex II deficiency and infantile leukoencephalopathy. Mitochondrial complex II deficiency is a disorder of the mitochondrial respiratory chain with heterogeneous clinical manifestations. Clinical features include psychomotor regression in infants, poor growth with lack of speech development, severe spastic quadriplegia, dystonia, progressive leukoencephalopathy, muscle weakness, exercise intolerance, and cardiomyopathy. Some patients manifest Leigh syndrome or Kearns-Sayre syndrome. Missense mutations c.164 G > C, p.Arg55Pro and c.170 G > A, p.Gly57Glu, homozygous transversion 169G-C, p. Gly57-Arg, homozygous non sense mutation c.103G>T (p.Glu35X), and homozygous nonsense mutation c.22C > T, p.Gln8X have been associated with mitochondrial complex II deficiency due to SDHAF1 disfunction.

== Interactions ==
SDHAF1 has 27 protein-protein interactions with 15 of them being co-complex interactions. HSCB, SDHB, ccdc136, KRT27, CIDEB, HSPA9, and ISCU have all been found to interact with SDHAF1.
