= Oxycarboxin =

Names
- Preferred IUPAC name 6-Methyl-4,4-dioxo-N-phenyl-3,4-dihydro-2H-1,4λ^{6}-oxathiine-5-carboxamide
- Other names Oxycarboxine; Dcmod; Oxicarboxin, Vitavax sulfone, Plantvax, Carbojet, 5,6-dihydro-2-methyl-1,4-oxathi-ine-3-carboxanilide-4,4-dioxide

Identifiers
CAS Number	5259-88-1
3D model (JSmol)	Interactive image
ChEBI	CHEBI:7858
ChEMBL	ChEMBL1712057
ChemSpider	20048
ECHA InfoCard	100.023.697
KEGG	C10956
PubChem CID	21330
UNII	NPU5GBN17X
CompTox Dashboard (EPA)	DTXSID8034792
- InChI: InChI=1S/C12H13NO4S/c1-9-11(18(15,16)8-7-17-9)12(14)13-10-5-3-2-4-6-10/h2-6H,7-8H2,1H3,(H,13,14) Key: AMEKQAFGQBKLKX-UHFFFAOYSA-N
- SMILES: CC1=C(S(=O)(=O)CCO1)/C(=N\c2ccccc2)/O

Properties
Chemical formula	C_{12}H_{13}NO_{4}S
Molar mass	267.30 g·mol^{−1}
Melting point	120 °C (248 °F; 393 K)
Solubility in water	moderate
Solubility	acetone, DMF, ethanol, and methanol

Related compounds
Related compounds	Carboxin
- Except where otherwise noted, data are given for materials in their standard state (at 25 °C [77 °F], 100 kPa). Infobox references

Oxycarboxin is an organic chemical used in agriculture to protect crops from fungal diseases. It was first marketed by Uniroyal in 1969 under the brand name Plantvax. The compound is a benzanilide analog which combines a heterocyclic acid with aniline to give an inhibitor of succinate dehydrogenase (SDHI).

== Synthesis ==
Oxyxarboxin was first made by the oxidation of carboxin, as disclosed in patents filed by Uniroyal.

Ethyl 2-chloroacetoacetate is treated with 2-mercaptoethanol and base, followed by cyclisation and water removal under acidic conditions. The resultant ethyl ester of the 1,4-oxathiine heterocycle is then formed into an amide with aniline using standard conditions via the carboxylic acid and acid chloride. This gives carboxin in high overall yield. The synthesis is completed by treatment with 30% hydrogen peroxide in acetic acid.

== Mechanism of action ==
Carboxin and oxycarboxin act by inhibition of succinate dehydrogenase (SDHI): they bind to the quinone reduction site of the enzyme complex, preventing ubiquinone from doing so. As a consequence, the tricarboxylic acid cycle and electron transport chain cannot function.

== Uses ==
Oxycarboxin is used to control rust diseases (e.g. soybean rust) at an application rate of 200–400 g/ha.

== History ==
Oxycarboxin has been commercially available since 1969, when it was introduced under the brand name Plantvax.
