= Pydiflumetofen =

Chemical fungicide

Names
- Preferred IUPAC name 3-(Difluoromethyl)-N-methoxy-1-methyl-N-[1-(2,4,6-trichlorophenyl)-2-propanyl]-1H-pyrazole-4-carboxamide
- Other names SYN545974

Identifiers
CAS Number	1228284-64-7
3D model (JSmol)	Interactive image
Beilstein Reference	20345474
ChEBI	CHEBI:87576
ChemSpider	34501423
ECHA InfoCard	100.252.186
EC Number	817-852-1
PubChem CID	56933411
UNII	WHG7I49FAK
CompTox Dashboard (EPA)	DTXSID60894826
- InChI: InChI=1S/C16H16Cl3F2N3O2/c1-8(4-10-12(18)5-9(17)6-13(10)19)24(26-3)16(25)11-7-23(2)22-14(11)15(20)21/h5-8,15H,4H2,1-3H3 Key: DGOAXBPOVUPPEB-UHFFFAOYSA-N
- SMILES: CC(CC1=C(C=C(C=C1Cl)Cl)Cl)N(C(=O)C2=CN(N=C2C(F)F)C)OC

Properties
Chemical formula	C_{16}H_{16}Cl_{3}F_{2}N_{3}O_{2}
Molar mass	426.67
Appearance	Off-white solid
Density	g/cm^{3}
Melting point	113°C
Solubility in water	1.5 mg/L (20 °C)
log P	3.8

Hazards
- GHS labelling
Pictograms	(GHS08: Health hazard) (GHS09: Environmental hazard)
Signal word	Warning
Hazard statements	H351, H361f, H410
Precautionary statements	P203, P273, P280, P318, P391, P405, P501
- Except where otherwise noted, data are given for materials in their standard state (at 25 °C [77 °F], 100 kPa). Infobox references

Pydiflumetofen belongs to the large family of SDHI pesticides, it is used as broad spectrum fungicide in agriculture to protect crops from fungal diseases. It was first marketed by Syngenta in 2016 using their brand name Miravis. The compound is an methoxyamide which combines a pyrazole acid with a substituted amphetamine to give an inhibitor of succinate dehydrogenase, an enzyme that is important to cellular respiration in almost all living organisms.

== History ==
Inhibition of succinate dehydrogenase, the complex II in the mitochondrial respiration chain, has been known as a fungicidal mechanism of action since the first examples were marketed in the 1960s. The first compound in this class was carboxin, which had a narrow spectrum of useful biological activity, mainly on basidiomycetes and was used as a seed treatment. By 2016, at least 17 further examples of this mechanism of action were developed by crop protection companies, with the market leader being boscalid, owing to its broader spectrum of fungal species controlled. However, it lacked full control of important cereal diseases, especially septoria leaf blotch Zymoseptoria tritici.

Pyrazole intermediate

A group of compounds which did control septoria were amides of pyrazole-4-carboxylic acid, with the most successful being derivatives with an N-methyl group and a difluromethyl group in position 3 of the ring. These include penthiopyrad and fluxapyroxad. Research chemists at Syngenta made many analogues of this type in the search for new products and by 2008 had discovered benzovindiflupyr, isopyrazam, sedaxane and pydiflumetofen.

== Synthesis ==
Pydiflumetofen combines 3-(difluoromethyl)-1-methyl-1H-pyrazole-4-carboxylic acid with a novel amine derivative which was made from 2,4,6-trichlorobenzaldehyde.

A nitrostyrene is formed in a Henry reaction between the aldehyde and nitroethane. A reduction reaction converts it to a ketone which forms an ketoxime with methoxyamine. This, in turn, is reduced with sodium cyanoborohydride to give the amine required for amide formation with the acid chloride of the pyrazole.

== Mechanism of action ==
Succinate dehydrogenase inhibitors (SDHI) of this type act by binding at the quinone reduction site of the enzyme complex, preventing ubiquinone from doing so. As a consequence, the tricarboxylic acid cycle and electron transport chain cannot function.

== Usage ==
Pydiflumetofen has fungicidal effects against a wide range of crop pests. These include Alternaria, grey mould (Botrytis cinerea), Cercospora (leaf spot), septoria, powdery mildews (e.g. Uncinula necator), and scab (e.g. Venturia pyrina). As a result, it has potential use in crops including cereals, corn, soybeans, vegetables, peanut, curcubits, potato and fruit. The compound was introduced in the US in 2018 but estimated usage that year was low at only 4,000 pounds (1,800 kg). The compound is registered for use on peanut and fruits. As of 2023 the compound is also registered in Argentina, Australia, Canada and New Zealand.

== Human safety ==
Pydiflumetofen has low acute toxicity: the Codex Alimentarius database maintained by the FAO lists the maximum residue limits for it in various food products.

== Environmental effects ==
The compound is very persistent in field conditions and its environmental fate and consequent ecotoxicology have been reviewed. In one laboratory study, the R enantiomer of the compound was shown to be more toxic to zebrafish, which was interpreted to be owing to its higher potency as an SDHI inhibitor than the S isomer.

== Resistance management ==
Fungal populations have the ability to develop resistance to SDHI inhibitors. This potential can be mitigated by careful management. Reports of individual pest species becoming resistant are monitored by manufacturers, regulatory bodies such as the EPA and the Fungicides Resistance Action Committee (FRAC). The risks of resistance developing can be reduced by using a mixture of two or more fungicides which each have activity on relevant pests but with unrelated mechanisms of action. FRAC assigns fungicides into classes so as to facilitate this.

== Brands ==
Pydiflumetofen is the ISO common name for the active ingredient which is formulated into the branded product sold to end-users. Miravis is the brand name for Syngenta's suspension concentrate, which it also calls Adepidyn technology. The Miravis brand line includes other products containing pydiflumetofen mixed with other fungicidal active ingredients. These include Miravis Duo and Miravis Top (containing difenoconazole), Miravis Neo (containing propiconazole and azoxystrobin), and Miravis SBX (containing difenoconazole and azoxystrobin).

Trebuset is the brand name for Syngenta's flowable concentrate formulation for use as a seed treatment.
