= Sedaxane =

Names
- Preferred IUPAC name N-[2-([1,1′-Bi(cyclopropan)]-2-yl)phenyl]-3-(difluoromethyl)-1-methyl-1H-pyrazole-4-carboxamide
- Other names SYN524464

Identifiers
CAS Number	874967-67-6
3D model (JSmol)	Interactive image
ChemSpider	9863260
ECHA InfoCard	100.214.982
PubChem CID	11688533
UNII	UHZ33J8Z9F
CompTox Dashboard (EPA)	DTXSID2058207
- InChI: InChI=1S/C18H19F2N3O/c1-23-9-14(16(22-23)17(19)20)18(24)21-15-5-3-2-4-11(15)13-8-12(13)10-6-7-10/h2-5,9-10,12-13,17H,6-8H2,1H3,(H,21,24) Key: XQJQCBDIXRIYRP-UHFFFAOYSA-N
- SMILES: CN1C=C(C(=N1)C(F)F)C(=O)NC2=CC=CC=C2C3CC3C4CC4

Properties
Chemical formula	C_{18}H_{19}F_{2}N_{3}O
Molar mass	331.367 g·mol^{−1}
Appearance	White powder
Odor	Odorless
Density	1.23 g/cm^{3} (26 °C)
Melting point	121.4 °C (250.5 °F; 394.5 K)
Solubility in water	Very slightly soluble (0.67 g/L, 20 °C)
Solubility in other solvents	Slightly soluble in acetone (410 g/L) and dichloromethane (500 g/L)
- Except where otherwise noted, data are given for materials in their standard state (at 25 °C [77 °F], 100 kPa). Infobox references

Sedaxane is a broad spectrum fungicide used as a seed treatment in agriculture to protect crops from fungal diseases. It was first marketed by Syngenta in 2011 using their brand name Vibrance. The compound is an amide which combines a pyrazole acid with an aryl amine to give a succinate dehydrogenase inhibitor (SDHI).

The compound is widely registered for use, including in Australia, the EU, UK and US.

== History ==
Inhibition of succinate dehydrogenase, the complex II in the mitochondrial respiration chain, has been known as a fungicidal mechanism of action since the first examples were marketed in the 1960s. The first compound in this class was carboxin, which had a narrow spectrum of useful biological activity, mainly on basidiomycetes and was used as a seed treatment. By 2016, at least 17 further examples of this mechanism of action were developed by crop protection companies, with the market leader being boscalid, owing to its broader spectrum of fungal species controlled. However, it lacked full control of important cereal diseases, especially septoria leaf blotch Zymoseptoria tritici.

Pyrazole intermediate

A group of compounds which did control septoria were amides of 3-(difluoromethyl)-1-methyl-1H-pyrazole-4-carboxylic acid. These included fluxapyroxad and pydiflumetofen as well as sedaxane.

== Synthesis ==
Sedaxane combines the acid chloride of the pyrazole carboxylic acid with a novel amine derivative which was made from 2-chlorobenzaldehyde.

A base-catalysed aldol condensation between the aldehyde and cyclopropyl methyl ketone forms an α,β-unsaturated carbonyl compound which, when combined with hydrazine gives a dihydropyrazole derivative. Further treatment with potassium hydroxide forms the second cyclopropyl ring and this material is converted to the aniline required for sedaxane formation by Buchwald–Hartwig amination using benzophenone imine in the presence of a palladium catalyst, followed by hydroxylamine.

Owing to a lack of stereoselectivity in the formation of the second cyclopropane ring, sedaxane consists of two diastereomers: two pairs of enantiomers which are cis–trans isomers. The commercial product consists of >80% of the trans isomers.

== Mechanism of action ==
SDHI of this type act by binding at the quinone reduction site of the enzyme complex, preventing ubiquinone from doing so. As a consequence, the tricarboxylic acid cycle and electron transport chain cannot function.

== Usage ==
Sedaxane is used as a seed treatment to control, for example, common bunt, Rhizoctonia species and Ustilago species (smuts). As a result, it has potential use in crops including cereals, cotton, potato and soybean. As of 2023 it is registered for use in Argentina, Australia, Canada, Chile, China, the EU, Mexico, the UK, Uruguay and the US.

== Human safety ==
Sedaxane has low toxicity and its use was found to leave no residues in human food: however the Codex Alimentarius database maintained by the FAO lists the maximum residue limits for it in various food products.

== Resistance management ==
Fungal populations have the ability to develop resistance to SDHI inhibitors. This potential can be mitigated by careful management. Reports of individual pest species becoming resistant are monitored by manufacturers, regulatory bodies such as the EPA and the Fungicides Resistance Action Committee (FRAC). The risks of resistance developing can be reduced by using a mixture of two or more fungicides which each have activity on relevant pests but with unrelated mechanisms of action. FRAC assigns fungicides into classes so as to facilitate this and sedaxane is frequently used in combination with other active ingredients as seed treatments.

== Brands ==
Sedaxane is the ISO common name for the active ingredient which is formulated into the branded product sold to end-users. Vibrance is the brand name for Syngenta's suspension concentrate.
