= Benzylsuccinate synthase =

Benzylsuccinate Synthase
- Catalytic Cys493 situated in the alpha-subunit of benzylsuccinate synthase

Identifiers
- EC no.: 4.1.99.11

Databases
- IntEnz: IntEnz view
- BRENDA: BRENDA entry
- ExPASy: NiceZyme view
- KEGG: KEGG entry
- MetaCyc: metabolic pathway
- PRIAM: profile
- PDB structures: RCSB PDB PDBe PDBsum
- Gene Ontology: AmiGO / QuickGO
Search
- PMC: articles
- PubMed: articles
- NCBI: proteins

The enzyme benzylsuccinate synthase (EC 4.1.99.11) catalyzes the chemical reaction

toluene + fumarate $\rightleftharpoons$ benzylsuccinate

This enzyme catalyses a radical-type addition of toluene and fumarate as substrates to generate (R)-benzylsuccinate as product, the first step of anaerobic toluene degradation.

Benzylsuccinate synthase is a glycyl-radical enzyme found in many microorganisms such as Thauera aromatica and Aromatoleum tuluolicum responsible for degrading aromatic hydrocarbons, primarily toluene. It operates by catalyzing carbon-carbon bond formation between toluene and fumarate into benzylsuccinate. Benzylsuccinate is then converted to benzoyl CoA in a scheme resembling β-oxidation, and then reductively de-aromatized into metabolites. BSS comprises an α, β, and γ subunit, with the α-subunit containing the activated glycyl-radical, and the β- and γ-subunits being necessary for formation and stability of the cataytically active enzyme. In terms of its catalytic residues, mutagenesis experiments suggest that in addition to Cys493 and Gly829 being critical for catalysis in a T. aromatica T1 strain, mutation of a conserved Arg508 is also critical for benzylsuccinate synthase activity.

== Nomenclature ==
This enzyme belongs to the family of glycyl-radical enzymes and is listed under the enzyme commission category of lyases, specifically in the "catch-all" class of carbon-carbon lyases. The systematic name of this enzyme class is benzylsuccinate fumarate-lyase (toluene-forming). This enzyme is also called benzylsuccinate fumarate-lyase, although it does not catalyse t, andhe cleavage of benzylsuccinate. This enzyme participates in feeding toluene into the pathway of benzoate degradation via CoA ligation.

== Mechanism ==
As a result of its intrinsic function, its sequence is being used as a gene marker when studying anoxic toluene contamination sites for active degradation

The mechanism proposed by Heider and coworkers is as follows: activated benzylsuccinate synthase contains a low-reactivity glycine radical at Gly829. Upon binding of both substrates to the active site, the glycine radical generates the thiyl radical on Cys429, which is in close proximity. This thiyl radical abstracts a proton from the methyl group of toluene, which adds to the double bond of fumarate. The benzylsuccinyl radical intermediate then abstracts a proton from Cys429, returning it to the thiyl state which can then restore the glycyl radical resting state.

== Environmental significance ==
Aromatic hydrocarbons such as toluene, ethylbenzene, and phenol are persistent pollutants in ecological systems, particularly in groundwater. Moreover, they are difficult to degrade due to their inertness, aromaticity, and lack of easily oxidizable functionalities. Microorganisms such as Magnetospirillum sp. have shown an ability to overcome these chemical obstacles by utilizing radical chemistry to functionalize these hydrocarbons for additional oxidation. However, the industrial utility of benzylsuccinate synthase appears to be limited to anaerobic conditions since the active form of the enzyme is easily and quickly degraded by molecular oxygen. This is present in many ambient environments, and interferes with the radical-glycyl chemistry performed at the active site. It is also believed that the inactive form of benzylsuccinate synthase is not compatible in oxic conditions due to a [4Fe-4S]-cluster that is oxygen sensitive and displays a low midpoint potential.

Salii and coworkers have shown that it is possible to expand the scope of substrates for benzylsuccinate synthase, expanding its applications for the biodegradation of aromatic hydrocarbons. This include m-, p-, and o-cresols which display a hydroxyl group in addition to the methyl group characteristic of toluene. In their work, substrate expansion was accomplished by mutating Ile617 to Val, as Ile617 and Ile620 were two amino acid residues predicted to form a protective hydrophobic wall around the active site.
