= 3-(Difluoromethyl)-1-methyl-1H-pyrazole-4-carboxylic acid =

Chemical compound

Names
- Preferred IUPAC name 3-(Difluoromethyl)-1-methyl-1H-pyrazole-4-carboxylic acid
- Other names CSAA798670, NOA449410, pyrazole acid

Identifiers
CAS Number	176969-34-9
3D model (JSmol)	Interactive image
Beilstein Reference	11698637
ChemSpider	14177094
ECHA InfoCard	100.117.460
EC Number	700-093-4
PubChem CID	18983008
UNII	20527OAN56
CompTox Dashboard (EPA)	DTXSID80597105
- InChI: InChI=1S/C6H6F2N2O2/c1-10-2-3(6(11)12)4(9-10)5(7)8/h2,5H,1H3,(H,11,12) Key: RLOHOBNEYHBZID-UHFFFAOYSA-N
- SMILES: CN1C=C(C(=N1)C(F)F)C(=O)O

Properties
Chemical formula	C_{6}H_{6}F_{2}N_{2}O_{2}
Molar mass	176.12
Melting point	200–201°C
- Except where otherwise noted, data are given for materials in their standard state (at 25 °C [77 °F], 100 kPa). Infobox references

3-(Difluoromethyl)-1-methyl-1H-pyrazole-4-carboxylic acid is a chemical compound which is used commercially as an intermediate to seven fungicides which act by inhibition of succinate dehydrogenase (SDHI). It consists of a pyrazole ring with difluoromethyl, methyl and carboxylic acid groups attached in specific positions.

== Background ==
Inhibition of succinate dehydrogenase, the complex II in the mitochondrial respiration chain, has been known as a fungicidal mechanism of action since the first examples were marketed in the 1960s. By 2016, at least 18 examples were developed by crop protection companies, with the market leader being boscalid, owing to its broad spectrum of fungal species controlled. However, it lacked full control of important cereal diseases, especially septoria leaf blotch Zymoseptoria tritici.

A group of compounds which did control septoria were 3-(difluoromethyl)-1-methyl-1H-pyrazole-4-carboxylic amides, as shown below, ordered by year of their first registration.

Structures of commercial SDHI inhibitors containing the pyrazole

Isopyrazam (2010)

Sedaxane (2011)

Bixafen (2011)

Fluxapyroxad (2011)

Benzovindiflupyr (2012)

Pydiflumetofen (2016)

Inpyrfluxam (2019)

== Synthesis ==
The first reported synthesis of the pyrazole acid was in 1993, by chemists at Monsanto.

The ethyl ester of difluoroacetoacetic acid is treated with triethyl orthoformate in the presence of acetic anhydride and then with methyl hydrazine, which forms mainly the required pyrazole ring, in addition to its isomer with the methyl group on the alternative nitrogen atom. This ester is then hydrolysed with sodium hydroxide to give the pyrazole acid.

Manufacture of the acid at large scale has been optimised by chemists at Syngenta, Bayer Crop Science and BASF.

== Uses ==
As of 2023, amides of the acid were commercialised in seven SDHI fungicides. The US Geological Survey for 2018 reported that the most heavily used there were fluxapyroxad, at 400,000 pounds (180,000 kg), followed by benzovindiflupyr at 200,000 pounds (91,000 kg). The acid has been reported as a metabolite of fluxapyroxad and pydiflumetofen and thus may be present in the environment where these materials are used. The most recently registered example of this class is Sumitomo's inpyrfluxam. Two further compounds, pyrapropoyne (Nissan Chemical Corporation) and flubeneteram (Dongguan Hec Tech) are under development.

This group of pyrazole carboxamide fungicides are very effective against major crop pests such as Alternaria species, including early blight of tomato and potato. However, none display commercial levels of activity against oomycetes, fungal-related organisms which include important diseases like Phytophthora infestans, late blight of potato.
