= SDHA =

Protein-coding gene in humans

Identifiers
- Aliases: SDHA, CMD1GG, FP, PGL5, SDH1, SDH2, SDHF, succinate dehydrogenase complex flavoprotein subunit A, MC2DN1, NDAXOA
- External IDs: OMIM: 600857; MGI: 1914195; GeneCards: SDHA
Enzyme activity
EC #	BRENDA	ExPASy	KEGG	MetaCyc
1.3.5.1	↗	↗	↗	↗

Gene location (Human)
Chr.	Chromosome 5 (human)
Band	5p15.33	Start	218,303 bp
Band	5p15.33	End	257,082 bp

Gene location (Mouse)
Chr.	Chromosome 13 (mouse)
Band	13|13 C1	Start	74,470,373 bp
Band	13|13 C1	End	74,498,399 bp
RNA expression pattern
Bgee	Human / Mouse (ortholog); Top expressed in: apex of heart; left ventricle; mucosa of transverse colon; right auricle of heart; skeletal muscle tissue; muscle of thigh; duodenum; gastrocnemius muscle; right lobe of liver; right adrenal cortex / Top expressed in: right ventricle; sternocleidomastoid muscle; digastric muscle; temporal muscle; right kidney; vastus lateralis muscle; triceps brachii muscle; aortic valve; medial head of gastrocnemius muscle; supraoptic nucleus; More reference expression data
BioGPS	n/a
Gene ontology
Molecular function	oxidoreductase activity; oxidoreductase activity, acting on the CH-CH group of donors; succinate dehydrogenase activity; protein binding; succinate dehydrogenase (ubiquinone) activity; flavin adenine dinucleotide binding; electron transfer activity
Cellular component	mitochondrial inner membrane; myelin sheath; mitochondrial respiratory chain complex II, succinate dehydrogenase complex (ubiquinone); membrane; mitochondrion; nucleolus; plasma membrane succinate dehydrogenase complex
Biological process	succinate metabolic process; tricarboxylic acid cycle; nervous system development; electron transport chain; respiratory electron transport chain; mitochondrial electron transport, succinate to ubiquinone; anaerobic respiration
Sources:Amigo / QuickGO
Orthologs
Databases	NCBI: entry; OMA: entry
Species	Human	Mouse
Entrez	6389	66945
Ensembl	ENSG00000073578	ENSMUSG00000021577
UniProt	P31040	Q8K2B3
RefSeq (mRNA)	NM_001294332; NM_004168; NM_001330758	NM_023281
RefSeq (protein)	NP_001281261; NP_001317687; NP_004159	NP_075770
Location (UCSC)	Chr 5: 0.22 – 0.26 Mb	Chr 13: 74.47 – 74.5 Mb
PubMed search
- Wikidata
View/Edit Human	View/Edit Mouse

Succinate dehydrogenase complex, subunit A, flavoprotein variant is a protein that in humans is encoded by the SDHA gene. This gene encodes a major catalytic subunit of succinate-ubiquinone oxidoreductase, a complex of the mitochondrial respiratory chain. The complex is composed of four nuclear-encoded subunits and is localized in the mitochondrial inner membrane. SDHA contains the FAD binding site where succinate is deprotonated and converted to fumarate. Mutations in this gene have been associated with a form of mitochondrial respiratory chain deficiency known as Leigh Syndrome. A pseudogene has been identified on chromosome 3q29. Alternatively spliced transcript variants encoding different isoforms have been found for this gene.

== Structure ==
The SDHA gene is located on the p arm of chromosome 5 at locus 15 and is composed of 17 exons. The SDHA protein encoded by this gene is 664 amino acids long and weighs 72.7 kDA.

SDHA protein has four subdomains, including capping domain, helical domain, C-terminal domain and most notably, β-barrel FAD-binding domain at N-terminus. Therefore, SDHA is a flavoprotein (Fp) due to the prosthetic group flavin adenine dinucleotide (FAD). Crystal structure suggests that FAD is covalently bound to a histidine residue (His99) and further coordinated by hydrogen bonds with number of other amino acid residues within the FAD-binding domain. FAD which is derived from riboflavin (vitamin B_{2}) is thus essential cofactor for SDHA and whole complex II function.

== Function ==

The SDH complex is located on the inner membrane of the mitochondria and participates in both the citric acid cycle and the respiratory chain. The succinate dehydrogenase (SDH) protein complex catalyzes the oxidation of succinate (succinate + ubiquinone => fumarate + ubiquinol). Electrons removed from succinate transfer to SDHA, transfer across SDHB through iron sulphur clusters to the SDHC/SDHD subunits on the hydrophobic end of the complex anchored in the mitochondrial membrane.

Initially, SDHA oxidizes succinate via deprotonation at the FAD binding site, forming FADH_{2} and leaving fumarate, loosely bound to the active site, free to exit the protein. The electrons derived from succinate tunnel along the [Fe-S] relay in the SDHB subunit until they reach the [3Fe-4S] iron sulfur cluster. The electrons are then transferred to an awaiting ubiquinone molecule at the Q pool active site in the SDHC/SDHD dimer. The O1 carbonyl oxygen of ubiquinone is oriented at the active site by hydrogen bond interactions with Tyr83 of SDHD. The presence of electrons in the [3Fe-4S] iron sulphur cluster induces the movement of ubiquinone into a second orientation. This facilitates a second hydrogen bond interaction between the O4 carbonyl group of ubiquinone and Ser27 of SDHC. Following the first single electron reduction step, a semiquinone radical species is formed. The second electron arrives from the [3Fe-4S] cluster to provide full reduction of the ubiquinone to ubiquinol.

SDHA acts as an intermediate in the basic SDH enzyme action:

1. SDHA converts succinate to fumarate as part of the citric acid cycle. This reaction also converts FAD to FADH_{2}.
2. Electrons from the FADH_{2} are transferred to the SDHB subunit iron clusters [2Fe-2S],[4Fe-4S],[3Fe-4S]. This function is part of the Respiratory chain
3. Finally the electrons are transferred to the Ubiquinone (Q) pool via the SDHC/SDHD subunits.

== Clinical significance ==
Because of the complexity of SDHA's locus, SDHA was rarely analyzed, but in an increasing amount of research, it's been found that mutations in SDHA are pathogenic for a number of conditions, including hereditary pheochromocytoma-paraganglioma (PPGL) syndrome, mitochondrial complex II deficiency, gastrointestinal stromal tumors, Leigh syndrome, dilated cardiomyopathy, and possible relation with pituitary adenomas, adrenal carcinomas, and other neuroendocrine tumors. Hereditary PPGL syndrome associated with mutations in SDHA is called "Paragangliomas 5" with likely lower penetrance than other SDHx mutations.

Bi-allelic mutations in SDHA are known to be pathogenic for infant or early childhood Leigh syndrome, a progressive brain disorder. It is not known, however, how mutations in the SDHA gene are related to the specific features of Leigh syndrome. There is some link between Leigh syndrome as a phenotype of mitochondrial complex II deficiency, but both can occur without the other as relating to SDHA mutations.

SDHA is a tumour suppressor gene, and heterozygous carriers have an increased risk of paragangliomas as well as pheochromocytomas and renal cancer. Risk management for heterozygous carriers of an SDHA mutation typically involve monitoring via annual urine tests for metanephrines and catecholamines as well as non-radiation imaging such as MRIs. PET scans and radiation imaging are used but should be limited to prevent radiation exposure.

== Interactive pathway map ==
Click on genes, proteins and metabolites below to link to respective articles. (Note: The interactive pathway map can be edited at WikiPathways: "TCACycle_WP78".)

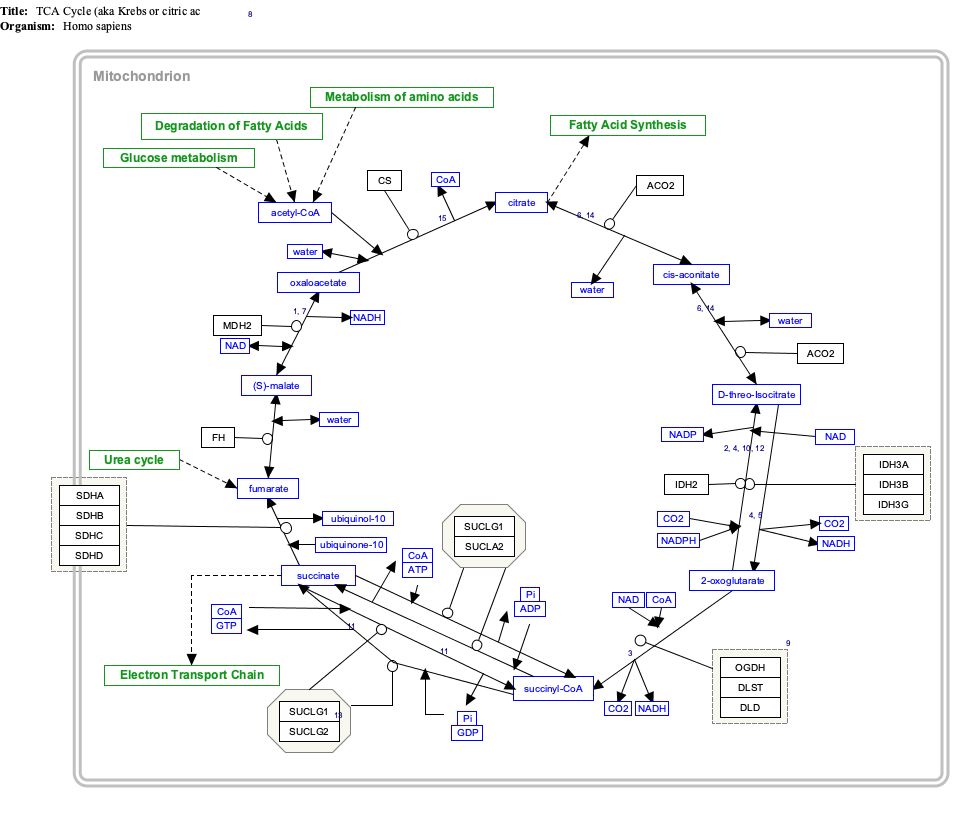

TCACycle_WP78 edit
