= SDHB =

Protein found in humans

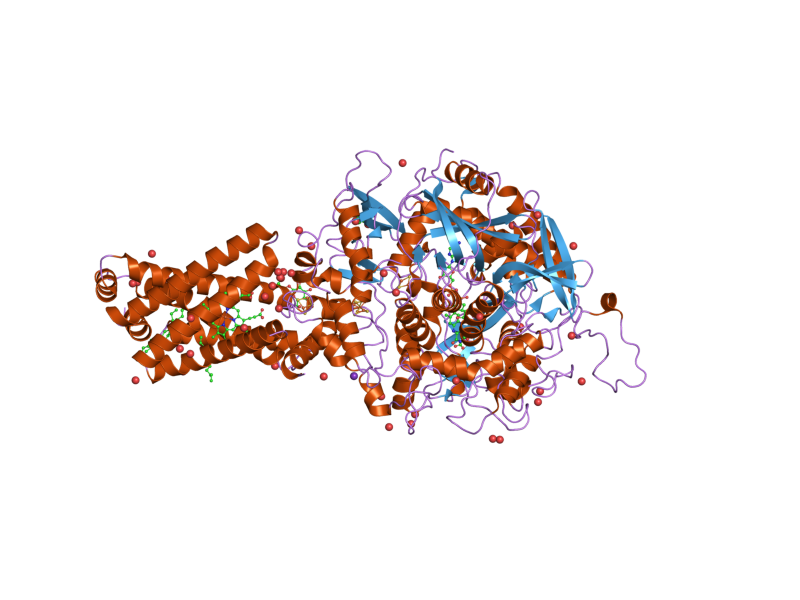

Identifiers
- Aliases: SDHB, CWS2, IP, PGL4, SDH, SDH1, SDH2, SDHIP, succinate dehydrogenase complex iron sulfur subunit B, MC2DN4
- External IDs: OMIM: 185470; MGI: 1914930; GeneCards: SDHB
Enzyme activity
EC #	BRENDA	ExPASy	KEGG	MetaCyc
1.3.5.1	↗	↗	↗	↗

Gene location (Human)
Chr.	Chromosome 1 (human)
Band	1p36.13	Start	17,018,722 bp
Band	1p36.13	End	17,054,032 bp

Gene location (Mouse)
Chr.	Chromosome 4 (mouse)
Band	4|4 D3	Start	140,688,514 bp
Band	4|4 D3	End	140,706,504 bp
RNA expression pattern
Bgee	Human / Mouse (ortholog); Top expressed in: left ventricle; apex of heart; gastrocnemius muscle; muscle of thigh; mucosa of transverse colon; right ventricle; right auricle of heart; right lobe of liver; vastus lateralis muscle; biceps brachii / Top expressed in: right ventricle; myocardium of ventricle; digastric muscle; interventricular septum; plantaris muscle; sternocleidomastoid muscle; cardiac muscles; soleus muscle; thoracic diaphragm; cardiac muscle tissue of left ventricle; More reference expression data
BioGPS	n/a
Gene ontology
Molecular function	ubiquinone binding; iron-sulfur cluster binding; metal ion binding; succinate dehydrogenase (ubiquinone) activity; protein binding; oxidoreductase activity; electron transfer activity; 2 iron, 2 sulfur cluster binding; 3 iron, 4 sulfur cluster binding; 4 iron, 4 sulfur cluster binding
Cellular component	membrane; plasma membrane; nucleoplasm; mitochondrial respiratory chain complex II, succinate dehydrogenase complex (ubiquinone); mitochondrial inner membrane; mitochondrion; mitochondrial membranes; respiratory chain complex II
Biological process	succinate metabolic process; aerobic dissimilation; tricarboxylic acid cycle; respiratory electron transport chain; electron transport chain
Sources:Amigo / QuickGO
Orthologs
Databases	NCBI: entry; OMA: entry
Species	Human	Mouse
Entrez	6390	67680
Ensembl	ENSG00000117118	ENSMUSG00000009863
UniProt	P21912	Q9CQA3
RefSeq (mRNA)	NM_003000	NM_023374; NM_001355515
RefSeq (protein)	NP_002991	NP_075863; NP_001342444
Location (UCSC)	Chr 1: 17.02 – 17.05 Mb	Chr 4: 140.69 – 140.71 Mb
PubMed search
- Wikidata
View/Edit Human	View/Edit Mouse

Succinate dehydrogenase [ubiquinone] iron-sulfur subunit, mitochondrial (SDHB) also known as iron-sulfur subunit of complex II (Ip) is a protein that in humans is encoded by the SDHB gene.

The succinate dehydrogenase (also called SDH or Complex II) protein complex catalyzes the oxidation of succinate (succinate + ubiquinone => fumarate + ubiquinol). SDHB is one of four protein subunits forming succinate dehydrogenase, the other three being SDHA, SDHC and SDHD. The SDHB subunit is connected to the SDHA subunit on the hydrophilic, catalytic end of the SDH complex. It is also connected to the SDHC/SDHD subunits on the hydrophobic end of the complex anchored in the mitochondrial membrane. The subunit is an iron-sulfur protein with three iron-sulfur clusters. It weighs 30 kDa.

== Structure ==
The gene that codes for the SDHB protein is nuclear, not mitochondrial DNA. However, the expressed protein is located in the inner membrane of the mitochondria. The location of the gene in humans is on the first chromosome at locus p36.1-p35. The gene is coded in 1,162 base pairs, partitioned in 8 exons. The expressed protein weighs 31.6 kDa and is composed of 280 amino acids. SDHB contains the iron-sulphur clusters necessary for tunneling electrons through the complex. It is located between SDHA and the two transmembrane subunits SDHC and SDHD.

== Function ==
Figure 1: Function of the SDHB protein. Electrons are transferred from the Citric Acid Cycle to the Respiratory Chain. Electron path is shown by red arrows.

The SDH complex is located on the inner membrane of the mitochondria and participates in both the citric acid cycle and respiratory chain. SDHB acts as an intermediate in the basic SDH enzyme action shown in Figure 1:

1. SDHA converts succinate to fumarate as part of the citric acid cycle. This reaction also converts FAD to FADH_{2}.
2. Electrons from the FADH_{2} are transferred to the SDHB subunit iron clusters [2Fe-2S],[4Fe-4S],[3Fe-4S].
3. Finally the electrons are transferred to the Ubiquinone (Q) pool via the SDHC/SDHD subunits. This function is part of the Respiratory chain.

Initially, SDHA oxidizes succinate via deprotonation at the FAD binding site, forming FADH_{2} and leaving fumarate, loosely bound to the active site, free to exit the protein. Electrons from FADH_{2} are transferred to the SDHB subunit iron clusters [2Fe-2S],[4Fe-4S],[3Fe-4S] and tunnel along the [Fe-S] relay until they reach the [3Fe-4S] iron sulfur cluster. The electrons are then transferred to an awaiting ubiquinone molecule at the Q pool active site in the SDHC/SDHD dimer. The O1 carbonyl oxygen of ubiquinone is oriented at the active site (image 4) by hydrogen bond interactions with Tyr83 of SDHD. The presence of electrons in the [3Fe-4S] iron sulphur cluster induces the movement of ubiquinone into a second orientation. This facilitates a second hydrogen bond interaction between the O4 carbonyl group of ubiquinone and Ser27 of SDHC. Following the first single electron reduction step, a semiquinone radical species is formed. The second electron arrives from the [3Fe-4S] cluster to provide full reduction of the ubiquinone to ubiquinol.

== Clinical significance ==
Germline mutations in the gene can cause familial paraganglioma (in old nomenclature, Paraganglioma Type PGL4). The same condition is often called familial pheochromocytoma. Less frequently, renal cell carcinoma can be caused by this mutation.

Paragangliomas related to SDHB mutations have a high rate of malignancy. When malignant, treatment is currently the same as for any malignant paraganglioma/pheochromocytoma.

=== Cancer ===
Paragangliomas caused by SDHB mutations have several distinguishing characteristics:

1. Malignancy is common, ranging 38–83% in carriers with disease. In contrast, tumors caused by SDHD mutations are almost always benign. Sporadic paragangliomas are malignant in less than 10% of cases.
2. Malignant paragangliomas caused by SDHB are usually (perhaps 92%) extra-adrenal. Sporadic pheochromocytomas/paragangliomas are extra-adrenal in less than 10% of cases.
3. The penetrance of the gene is often reported as 77% by age 50 (i.e. 77% of carriers will have at least one tumour by the age of 50). This is likely an overestimate. Currently (2011), families with silent SDHB mutations are being screened to determine the frequency of silent carriers.
4. The average age of onset is approximately the same for SDHB vs non-SDHB related disease (approximately 36 years).

Mutations causing disease have been seen in exons 1 through 7, but not 8. As with the SDHC and SDHD genes, SDHB is a tumor suppressor gene.

Tumor formation generally follows the Knudson "two hit" hypothesis. The first copy of the gene is mutated in all cells, however the second copy functions normally. When the second copy mutates in a certain cell due to a random event, loss of heterozygosity (LOH) occurs and the SDHB protein is no longer produced. Tumor formation then becomes possible.

Given the fundamental nature of the SDH protein in all cellular function, it is not currently understood why only paraganglionic cells are affected. However, the sensitivity of these cells to oxygen levels may play a role.

=== Disease pathways ===
The precise pathway leading from SDHB mutation to tumorigenesis is not determined; there are several proposed mechanisms.

==== Generation of reactive oxygen species ====
Figure 2: Disease Pathways for SDHB mutations. Electron path during normal function is shown by solid red arrows. Red dashed arrow shows superoxide generation (Pathway 1). Purple dashed arrow shows diffusion of succinate to block PHD (Pathway 2). Black crosses indicate the non-mutated process is blocked.

When succinate-ubiquinone activity is inhibited, electrons that would normally transfer through the SDHB subunit to the Ubiquinone pool are instead transferred to O_{2} to create Reactive Oxygen Species (ROS) such as superoxide. The dashed red arrow in Figure 2 shows this. ROS accumulate and stabilize the production of HIF1-α. HIF1-α combines with HIF1-β to form the stable HIF heterodimeric complex, in turn leading to the induction of antiapoptotic genes in the cell nucleus.

==== Succinate accumulation in the cytosol ====
SDH inactivation can block the oxidation of succinate, starting a cascade of reactions:

1. The succinate accumulated in the mitochondrial matrix diffuses through the inner and outer mitochondrial membranes to the cytosol (purple dashed arrows in Figure 2).
2. Under normal cellular function, HIF1-α in the cytosol is quickly hydroxylated by prolyl hydroxylase (PHD), shown with the light blue arrow. This process is blocked by the accumulated succinate.
3. HIF1-α stabilizes and passes to the cell nucleus (orange arrow) where it combines with HIF1-β to form an active HIF complex that induces the expression of tumor causing genes.

This pathway raises the possibility of a therapeutic treatment. The build-up of succinate inhibits PHD activity. PHD action normally requires oxygen and alpha-ketoglutarate as cosubstrates and ferrous iron and ascorbate as cofactors. Succinate competes with α-ketoglutarate in binding to the PHD enzyme. Therefore, increasing α-ketoglutarate levels can offset the effect of succinate accumulation.

Normal α-ketoglutarate does not permeate cell walls efficiently, and it is necessary to create a cell permeating derivative (e.g. α-ketoglutarate esters). In-vitro trials show this supplementation approach can reduce HIF1-α levels, and may result in a therapeutic approach to tumours resulting from SDH deficiency.

==== Impaired developmental apoptosis ====
Paraganglionic tissue is derived from the neural crest cells present in an embryo. Abdominal extra-adrenal paraganglionic cells secrete catecholamines that play an important role in fetal development. After birth these cells usually die, a process that is triggered by a decline in nerve growth factor (NGF), which initiates apoptosis (cell death).

This cell death process is mediated by an enzyme called prolyl hydroxylase EglN3. Succinate accumulation caused by SDH inactivation inhibits the prolyl hydroxylase EglN3. The net result is that paranglionic tissue that would normally die after birth remains, and this tissue may be able to trigger paraganglioma/pheochromocytoma later.

==== Glycolysis upregulation ====
Inhibition of the Citric Acid Cycle forces the cell to create ATP glycolytically in order to generate its required energy. The induced glycolytic enzymes could potentially block cell apoptosis.

=== RNA editing ===
The mRNA transcripts of the SDHB gene in human are edited through an unknown mechanism at ORF nucleotide position 136 causing the conversion of C to U and thus generating a stop codon resulting in the translation of the edited transcripts to a truncated SDHB protein with an R46X amino acid change. This editing has been shown in monocytes and some human lymphoid cell-lines, and is enhanced by hypoxia.

== Interactive pathway map ==
Click on genes, proteins and metabolites below to link to respective articles. (Note: The interactive pathway map can be edited at WikiPathways: "TCACycle_WP78".)

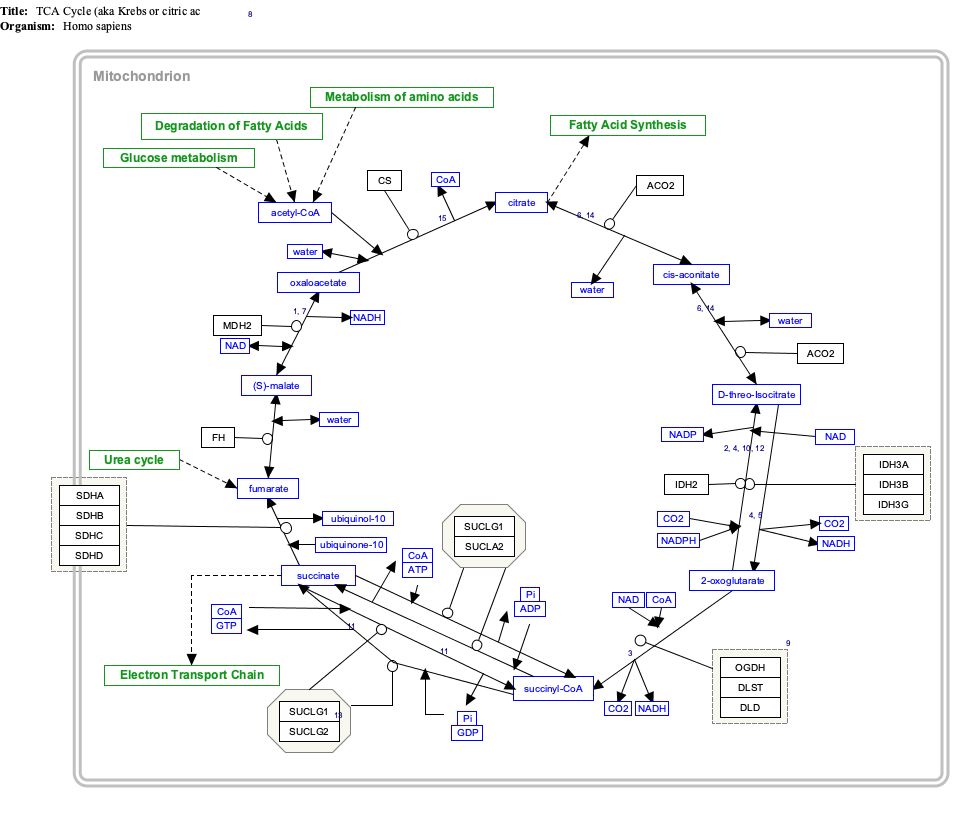

TCACycle_WP78 edit
