= NADH:ubiquinone reductase (Na+-transporting) =

Na(+)-translocating NADH-quinone reductase

Identifiers
- Symbol: NQR
- Pfam: PF03116
- TCDB: 3.D.5
- OPM superfamily: 372
- OPM protein: 4pbv
Available protein structures:
- PDB: PF03116 (ECOD; PDBsum)
- AlphaFold: PF03116

NADH:ubiquinone reductase (Na^{+}-transporting)

Identifiers
- EC no.: 7.2.1.1

Databases
- IntEnz: IntEnz view
- BRENDA: BRENDA entry
- ExPASy: NiceZyme view
- KEGG: KEGG entry
- MetaCyc: metabolic pathway
- PRIAM: profile
- PDB structures: RCSB PDB PDBe PDBsum
Search
- PMC: articles
- PubMed: articles
- NCBI: proteins

NADH:ubiquinone reductase (Na^{+}-transporting) (EC 7.2.1.1) is an enzyme with systematic name NADH:ubiquinone oxidoreductase (Na^{+}-translocating).

In bacteria, three different types of respiratory NADH:quinone oxidoreductases (NQr) have been described: the electrogenic complex I, also called NDH I in bacteria, the non-electrogenic NADH:quinone oxidoreductases (NDH II), and the Na^{+}-translocating NADH:quinone oxidoreductases Na^{+}-NQr. The common function of these transmembrane enzymes in respiration is to oxidize NADH using ubiquinone (Q) as electron acceptor. The net reaction thus yields ubiquinol (QH2), the reducing substrate of enzyme complexes further along the respiratory chain, and NAD^{+}, which is used as oxidizing agent in numerous cellular processes.

NADH + H^{+} + ubiquinone + n Na^{+}in → NAD^{+} + ubiquinol + n Na^{+}out

The enzyme is iron-sulfur flavoprotein.
