= PGL2 =

PGL2 may refer to

- SDHAF2, a gene on chromosome 11 in humans
- for the group $\mathrm{PGL}_2$ in mathematics, see projective linear group and modular group
