= Dihydroorotate dehydrogenase (fumarate) =

Chemical enzyme

Identifiers
- EC no.: 1.3.98.1
- CAS no.: 2603876

Databases
- IntEnz: IntEnz view
- BRENDA: BRENDA entry
- ExPASy: NiceZyme view
- KEGG: KEGG entry
- MetaCyc: metabolic pathway
- PRIAM: profile
- PDB structures: RCSB PDB PDBe PDBsum
Search
- PMC: articles
- PubMed: articles
- NCBI: proteins

Dihydroorotate dehydrogenase (fumarate) (EC 1.3.98.1, dihydroorotate oxidase, pyr4 (gene)) is an enzyme with systematic name (S)-dihydroorotate:fumarate oxidoreductase.

The enzyme is found in the bacterium Lactococcus lactis and the yeast Saccharomyces cerevisiae. It contains the cofactor, flavin mononucleotide and catalyses the following chemical reaction which is part of the biosynthesis of pyrimidine nucleotides.

dihydroorotic acid
+
fumaric acid
orotic acid
+
succinic acid
