= Carboxin =

Chemical compound used to kill fungi

Names
- Preferred IUPAC name 2-methyl-N-phenyl-5,6-dihydro-1,4-oxathiine-3-carboxamide

Identifiers
CAS Number	5234-68-4
3D model (JSmol)	Interactive image
Beilstein Reference	983249
ChEBI	CHEBI:3405
ChEMBL	ChEMBL1231667
ChemSpider	20027
ECHA InfoCard	100.023.665
EC Number	226-031-1
PubChem CID	21307
UNII	5A8K850HDE
CompTox Dashboard (EPA)	DTXSID0023951
- InChI: InChI=1S/C12H13NO2S/c1-9-11(16-8-7-15-9)12(14)13-10-5-3-2-4-6-10/h2-6H,7-8H2,1H3,(H,13,14) Key: GYSSRZJIHXQEHQ-UHFFFAOYSA-N
- SMILES: CC1=C(SCCO1)C(=O)NC2=CC=CC=C2

Properties
Chemical formula	C_{12}H_{13}NO_{2}S
Molar mass	235.3
Appearance	Off-white solid
Density	1.45 g/cm^{3}
Melting point	91.5°C
Solubility in water	134 mg/L
log P	2.3

Hazards
- GHS labelling
Pictograms	(GHS07: Exclamation mark) (GHS08: Health hazard) (GHS09: Environmental hazard)
Signal word	Warning
Hazard statements	H317, H373, H410
Precautionary statements	P260, P272, P273, P280, P302+P352, P319, P321, P333+P313, P362+P364, P391, P501

Related compounds
Related compounds	Oxycarboxin
- Except where otherwise noted, data are given for materials in their standard state (at 25 °C [77 °F], 100 kPa). Infobox references

Carboxin is a narrow-spectrum fungicide used as a seed treatment in agriculture to protect crops from fungal diseases. It was first marketed by Uniroyal in 1969 using their brand name Vitavax. The compound is a benzanilide analog that combines a heterocyclic acid with aniline to give an inhibitor of succinate dehydrogenase (SDHI).

== Synthesis ==
The first synthesis of carboxin was disclosed in patents filed by Uniroyal.

Ethyl 2-chloroacetoacetate is treated with 2-mercaptoethanol and base, followed by cyclisation and water removal under acidic conditions. The resultant ethyl ester of the 1,4-oxathiine heterocycle is then formed into an amide with aniline using standard conditions via the carboxylic acid and acid chloride. This gives carboxin in high overall yield. The compound has been crystallised in two polymorphic forms, which have equal biological activity.

== Mechanism of action ==
The mechanism of action of carboxin was not established until several years after it was first reported in 1966. In the period 1971–1975, evidence grew that it acted by inhibition of succinate dehydrogenase (SDHI), and later work showed that it binds to the quinone reduction site of the enzyme complex, preventing ubiquinone from doing so. As a consequence, the tricarboxylic acid cycle and electron transport chain cannot function.

The compound was an early example of a fungicide exhibiting systemic movement from its application site on the crop plant to protect newly-growing tissue.

== Usage ==
Owing to its systemic properties, carboxin is suitable for use as a seed treatment to give fungal control on the growing crop. However, it controls a relatively narrow range of species: mainly Tilletia spp. (known as bunts and smuts) in cereal crops and Rhizoctonia in cotton and vegetables.

The compound was used in Australia, the EU, the UK and the US but registration has lapsed in the EU. It was reported to have had a total worldwide sales of $75 million in 2014.

== Human safety ==
Carboxin has low mammalian toxicity and is not persistent in the environment. One of its metabolites, the sulfone, is also active as an SDHI and has been sold as the fungicide oxycarboxin.

== Analogues ==
Carboxin was the first SDHI-type fungicide and its invention triggered a search for compounds with improved properties, particularly for active ingredients which would control a broader range of economically-important diseases. Boscalid, introduced in 2003, retained the aniline amide part-structure but with a pyridine ring in place of the 1,4-oxathiine and with a second benzene ring attached to the aniline portion. By 2014, it had annual sales of $390 million.

As of 2023, over 18 related amides had been marketed, with seven of these being derivatives of 3-(Difluoromethyl)-1-methyl-1H-pyrazole-4-carboxylic acid. The Fungicides Resistance Action Committee (FRAC) assigns fungicides into classes so as to facilitate resistance management and SDHI form one group.

== Brands ==
Carboxin is the ISO common name for the active ingredient which is formulated into the branded product sold to end-users. Vitavax is the brand name originally used by Uniroyal but as the compound's patents expired it became available to many other manufacturers and has been sold under multiple names.
