= Fluopyram =

Names
- Preferred IUPAC name N-{2-[3-Chloro-5-(trifluoromethyl)pyridin-2-yl]ethyl}-2-(trifluoromethyl)benzamide

Identifiers
CAS Number	658066-35-4
3D model (JSmol)	Interactive image
ChemSpider	9333461
ECHA InfoCard	100.127.749
PubChem CID	11158353
UNII	F0VT7K5302
CompTox Dashboard (EPA)	DTXSID9058151
- InChI: InChI=1S/C16H11ClF6N2O/c17-12-7-9(15(18,19)20)8-25-13(12)5-6-24-14(26)10-3-1-2-4-11(10)16(21,22)23/h1-4,7-8H,5-6H2,(H,24,26) Key: KVDJTXBXMWJJEF-UHFFFAOYSA-N
- SMILES: FC(F)(F)c1ccccc1C(=O)NCCc2ncc(cc2Cl)C(F)(F)F

Properties
Chemical formula	C_{16}H_{11}ClF_{6}N_{2}O
Molar mass	396.72 g·mol^{−1}
Melting point	117.5 °C (243.5 °F; 390.6 K)
Boiling point	318–321 °C (604–610 °F; 591–594 K)
- Except where otherwise noted, data are given for materials in their standard state (at 25 °C [77 °F], 100 kPa). Infobox references

Fluopyram is a synthetic fungicide and nematicide used in agriculture. It is used to control fungal diseases such as gray mold (Botrytis cinerea), powdery mildew, apple scab, Alternaria, Sclerotinia, and Monilinia. It is an inhibitor of succinate dehydrogenase (SDHI fungicide).

== Regulation ==
Developed and produced by Bayer, it was approved in 2012 by the U.S. Environmental Protection Agency and in 2013 it was approved in the EU for use as an active ingredient in pesticides.

Pesticide products containing fluopyram have been banned in Denmark because the chemical can degrade into trifluoroacetic acid, which can then contaminate groundwater and not decompose.
