= Bixafen =

Names
- IUPAC name N-[2-(3,4-dichlorophenyl)-4-fluorophenyl]-3-(difluoromethyl)-1-methylpyrazole-4-carboxamide
- Other names: Bixafene

Identifiers
| CAS Number | 581809-46-3 |
| 3D model (JSmol) | Interactive image |
| ChEBI | CHEBI:83106 |
| ChemSpider | 9609314 |
| ECHA InfoCard | 100.170.250 |
| EC Number | 642-423-9 |
| PubChem CID | 11434448 |
| UNII | 28XK2L8M3B |
| CompTox Dashboard (EPA) | DTXSID6058134 |
- InChI: InChI=1S/C18H12Cl2F3N3O/c1-26-8-12(16(25-26)17(22)23)18(27)24-15-5-3-10(21)7-11(15)9-2-4-13(19)14(20)6-9/h2-8,17H,1H3,(H,24,27) Key: LDLMOOXUCMHBMZ-UHFFFAOYSA-N
- SMILES: CN1C=C(C(=N1)C(F)F)C(=O)NC2=C(C=C(C=C2)F)C3=CC(=C(C=C3)Cl)Cl

Properties
| Chemical formula | C_{18}H_{12}Cl_{2}F_{3}N_{3}O |
| Molar mass | 414.21 g·mol^{−1} |
| Appearance | white |
| Melting point | 146.6 °C (295.9 °F; 419.8 K) |
| Boiling point | 250 °C (482 °F; 523 K) (decomposes) |
| Solubility in water | 0.00049 g/L |
| Solubility in acetone | >250 g/L |
| Solubility in dimethyl sulfoxide | >250 g/L |
| Solubility in dichloromethane | 102 g/L |
| Solubility in ethyl acetate | 82 g/L |
| Solubility in methanol | 32 g/L |
| Solubility in toluene | 16 g/L |
| log P | 3.3 |
| Vapor pressure | 4.6×10^{−8} Pa |
| Henry's law constant (k_{H}) | 3.89×10^{−5} Pa·m^{3}·mol^{-1} |

Hazards
- GHS labelling
| Pictograms | (GHS09: Environmental hazard) |
| Signal word | Warning |
| Hazard statements | H303+H313+H333, H410 |
| Precautionary statements | P273, P301+P317, P302+P317, P304+P317, P391, P501 |
- Except where otherwise noted, data are given for materials in their standard state (at 25 °C [77 °F], 100 kPa). Infobox references

Bixafen is a chemical compound belonging to the groups of pyrazoles, carboxamides, and biphenyls.

== Properties ==
Bixafen is a colorless solid that is practically insoluble in water. It is stable to hydrolysis.

== Synthesis ==
Bixafen can be prepared by reductive Suzuki–Miyaura coupling of the potassium salt of 2-nitro-5-fluorobenzoic acid with 3,4-dichlorobromobenzene to form the corresponding biaryl compound, followed by reaction with the pyrazole carboxylic acid chloride (1-methyl-3-(difluoromethyl)-4-chlorocarbonyl-1H-pyrazole) in the presence of a base such as triethylamine.

== Uses ==
Bixafen is used as a fungicide on cereal crops. It was introduced to the market by Bayer in 2011. Its mode of action is based on the inhibition of succinate dehydrogenase. Combination formulations with prothioconazole and other compounds are also used.

== Approval ==
The active ingredient was approved by the European Commission with effect from October 1, 2013.

In a number of EU countries, including Germany and Austria, as well as in Switzerland, pesticides (e.g., Aviator Xpro) containing this active ingredient are approved.
