= SDHAF2 =

Protein-coding gene in humans

Identifiers
- Aliases: SDHAF2, C11orf79, PGL2, SDH5, succinate dehydrogenase complex assembly factor 2
- External IDs: OMIM: 613019; MGI: 1913322; HomoloGene: 32370; GeneCards: SDHAF2; OMA:SDHAF2 - orthologs

Gene location (Human)
Chr.	Chromosome 11 (human)
Band	11q12.2	Start	61,430,042 bp
Band	11q12.2	End	61,446,733 bp

Gene location (Mouse)
Chr.	Chromosome 19 (mouse)
Band	19|19 A	Start	10,477,898 bp
Band	19|19 A	End	10,503,506 bp
RNA expression pattern
Bgee	Human / Mouse (ortholog); Top expressed in: islet of Langerhans; anterior pituitary; granulocyte; monocyte; mucosa of ileum; apex of heart; mucosa of transverse colon; right adrenal gland; left adrenal gland; right adrenal cortex / Top expressed in: otic placode; saccule; interventricular septum; otic vesicle; sternocleidomastoid muscle; myocardium of ventricle; cardiac muscles; temporal muscle; digastric muscle; fetal liver hematopoietic progenitor cell; More reference expression data
BioGPS	n/a
Gene ontology
Molecular function	protein binding
Cellular component	mitochondrial matrix; mitochondrion; nucleolus; cytosol
Biological process	mitochondrial electron transport, succinate to ubiquinone; protein-FAD linkage; tricarboxylic acid cycle; mitochondrial respiratory chain complex II assembly; protein dephosphorylation; negative regulation of epithelial to mesenchymal transition; negative regulation of canonical Wnt signaling pathway
Sources:Amigo / QuickGO
Orthologs
Species	Human	Mouse
Entrez	54949	66072
Ensembl	ENSG00000167985	ENSMUSG00000024668
UniProt	Q9NX18	Q8C6I2
RefSeq (mRNA)	NM_017841	NM_025333
RefSeq (protein)	NP_060311	NP_079609
Location (UCSC)	Chr 11: 61.43 – 61.45 Mb	Chr 19: 10.48 – 10.5 Mb
PubMed search
- Wikidata
View/Edit Human	View/Edit Mouse

Succinate dehydrogenase complex assembly factor 2, formerly known as SDH5 and also known as SDH assembly factor 2 or SDHAF2 is a protein that in humans is encoded by the SDHAF2 gene. This gene encodes a mitochondrial protein needed for the flavination of a succinate dehydrogenase complex subunit required for activity of the complex. Mutations in this gene are associated with pheochromocytoma and paraganglioma.

== Structure ==
SDHAF2 is located on the q arm of chromosome 11 in position 12.2 and spans 16,642 base pairs. The SDHAF2 gene produces a 6.7 kDa protein composed of 65 amino acids. This highly conserved protein is a cofactor of flavin adenine dinucleotide (FAD). The structure represents a five-helix bundle with a region of well-defined conserved surface residues. This conserved region includes a negatively charged periphery and a positively charged surface, and a patch that is hydrophobic. The region is located in α-helices I, II, and the connecting band.

== Function ==
The SDHAF2 gene encodes a mitochondrial protein associated with the succinate dehydrogenase (SDH) complex (mitochondrial complex II) in the mitochondrial respiratory chain, which plays essential roles in both the electron transport chain and the Krebs (tricarboxylic acid) cycle. SDHAF2 is integral in the proper function of the SDH complex, mainly in SDH-dependent respiration, and interacts with the catalytic subunit of the complex. SDHAF2 participates in the flavination of SDH1 (SDHA), another subunit of the SDH complex. It does so by incorporating the flavin adenine dinucleotide (FAD) cofactor into SDHA. Such flavination is required for a fully functional SDH complex. Knockdown of SDHAF2 leads to the loss-of-function of the SDH complex, a decrease in the enzyme complex stability, and a substantial reduction in all subunits. SDHAF2 was also found to function as a tumor suppressor.

== Clinical significance ==
SDHAF2 is a tumor suppressor gene. Constitutional mutations in this gene cause hereditary paraganglioma, a neuroendocrine tumor formerly known to be linked to SDH subunit mutations. paraganglioma is a neural crest tumor usually derived from the chemoreceptor tissue of a paraganglion, and may develop at various body sites, including the head, neck, thorax and abdomen. Most commonly, they are located in the head and neck region, specifically at the carotid bifurcation, the jugular foramen, the vagus nerve, and in the middle ear. Phenotypes include excessive catecholamine induced hypertension, dysfunction of major blood vessels and cranial nerves, significant morbidity, sweating, and palpitations. In cases of extra-adrenal localization, the tumor may turn metastatic and aggressive. Loss of SDH complex function has been known to be responsible for paraganglioma. Mutations in this gene are found in the DNA of only a small fraction of patients with the disease.

== Interactions ==
SDHAF2 interacts with SDHA within the SDH catalytic dimer. In addition to SDHA, SDHAF2 has 17 protein–protein interactions, including interactions with proteins such as IMMT, SUCLG2, UBINEDDSUMO1, SSX2IP, and others.
