= Fluxapyroxad =

Names
- Preferred IUPAC name 3-(Difluoromethyl)-1-methyl-N-(3′,4′,5′-trifluoro[1,1′-biphenyl]-2-yl)-1H-pyrazole-4-carboxamide

Identifiers
CAS Number	907204-31-3
3D model (JSmol)	Interactive image
ChEBI	CHEBI:83113
ChemSpider	17253690
ECHA InfoCard	100.107.372
PubChem CID	16095400
UNII	7U8P4NAR2S
CompTox Dashboard (EPA)	DTXSID6058215
- InChI: InChI=1S/C18H12F5N3O/c1-26-8-11(16(25-26)17(22)23)18(27)24-14-5-3-2-4-10(14)9-6-12(19)15(21)13(20)7-9/h2-8,17H,1H3,(H,24,27) Key: SXSGXWCSHSVPGB-UHFFFAOYSA-N
- SMILES: CN1C=C(C(=N1)C(F)F)C(=O)NC2=CC=CC=C2C3=CC(=C(C(=C3)F)F)F

Properties
Chemical formula	C_{18}H_{12}F_{5}N_{3}O
Molar mass	381.306 g·mol^{−1}
- Except where otherwise noted, data are given for materials in their standard state (at 25 °C [77 °F], 100 kPa). Infobox references

Fluxapyroxad is a broad-spectrum pyrazole-carboxamide fungicide used on a large variety of commercial crops. It stunts fungus growth by inhibiting the succinate dehydrogenase (SQR) enzyme. Application of fluxapyroxad helps prevent many wilts and other fungal infections from taking hold. As with other systemic pesticides that have a long chemical half-life, there are concerns about keeping fluxapyroxad out of the groundwater, especially when combined with pyraclostrobin. There is also concern that some fungi may develop resistance to fluxapyroxad.

== Chemical structure ==
The compound is an amide of 3-(difluoromethyl)-1-methyl-1H-pyrazole-4-carboxylic acid combined with an aniline having an ortho-substituted trifluorobenzene group.

== Biological action ==
Fluxapyroxad is a succinate dehydrogenase inhibitor (SDHI). It interferes with a number of key fungal life functions, including spore germination, germ tube growth, appresoria formation and mycelium growth. Specifically it interferes with the production of succinate dehydrogenase, the complex II in the mitochondrial respiration chain, which in turn interferes with the tricarboxylic cycle and mitochondrial electron transport.

== Crops ==
Fluxapyroxad is commonly used as a fungicide for grains, row crops, vegetable crops, and fruit trees (pome and prunus), including:

Grains:

- Barley
- Corn (all types)
- Oats
- Rice
- Rye
- Triticale
- Wheat

Row and vegetable crops:

- Shelled peas and beans, both succulent and dried
- Edible-pod legume vegetables
- Fruiting vegetables (including tomatoes)
- Oilseed crops (flax seed, rapeseed, safflower and sunflower)
- Peanuts
- Soybeans
- Sugar beets
- Tuberous and corm vegetables (potato)

Fruit trees:

- Apples
- Crabapples
- Oriental pears (Pyrus pyrifolia)
- Pears
- Apricots
- Cherries (sweet and tart)
- Nectarines
- Peaches
- Plums (all varieties)

Nut trees

- Almond
- Pecan

== Fungal diseases ==
Fluxapyroxad provides protection against many fungal diseases. Studies have shown specific efficacy against diseases such as black point, Botrytis gray mold, early blight, and powdery mildew; however, fluxapyroxad was found to have no efficacy against anthracnose on lentils.

== Toxicity ==
Fluxapyroxad has a low toxicity for humans, slightly toxic after a single ingestion, and relatively non-toxic after single inhalation or topical skin contact. However, fluxapyroxad is highly toxic to fish, fresh-water and salt-water invertebrates, and to aquatic plants, as well as being toxic to small mammals. The primary target organ for fluxapyroxad exposure is the liver. As the dose or duration of exposure to fluxapyroxad increased, clinical chemistry changes related to liver function also occurred, followed by hepatocellular necrosis, neoplastic changes in the liver, and tumors. Fluxapyroxad was found "not likely" to be carcinogenic in humans and there was no evidence of neurotoxicity.

The United States Environmental Protection Agency has established tolerance amounts that are allowed to be present on consumer food. These range from 0.05 ppm on almonds and pecans to 3.0 ppm on leafy brassica, and 15 ppm on other leafy vegetables. The EPA is currently considering reducing those tolerances.

== Registration and approval ==
Fluxapyroxad has been approved for use as a fungicide in the United States, Canada and the European Union. In the spring of 2012, fluxapyroxad, trademarked under the names Sercadis, Imbrex and Xemium and manufactured by BASF Corporation, was registered for use as a fungicide in the United States. Fluxapyroxad is also one of the two active ingredients in Priaxor fungicide and Merivon fungicide, the other active ingredient being a strobilurin called pyraclostrobin.
