= Benzanilide =

Names
- Preferred IUPAC name N-Phenylbenzamide
- Other names N-Benzoylphenylamine

Identifiers
CAS Number	93-98-1
3D model (JSmol)	Interactive image; Interactive image
ChEMBL	ChEMBL115523
ChemSpider	6900
ECHA InfoCard	100.002.085
EC Number	202-292-7
PubChem CID	7168
UNII	AK1B12366O
CompTox Dashboard (EPA)	DTXSID9059096
- InChI: InChI=1S/C13H11NO/c15-13(11-7-3-1-4-8-11)14-12-9-5-2-6-10-12/h1-10H,(H,14,15) Key: ZVSKZLHKADLHSD-UHFFFAOYSA-N; InChI=1/C13H11NO/c15-13(11-7-3-1-4-8-11)14-12-9-5-2-6-10-12/h1-10H,(H,14,15) Key: ZVSKZLHKADLHSD-UHFFFAOYAY
- SMILES: O=C(Nc1ccccc1)c2ccccc2; c1ccc(cc1)C(=O)Nc2ccccc2

Properties
Chemical formula	C_{13}H_{11}NO
Molar mass	197.237 g·mol^{−1}
Appearance	white solid
Density	1.314 g/cm^{3}
Melting point	162 to 164 °C (324 to 327 °F; 435 to 437 K)
Solubility in water	insoluble
Dipole moment	2.71

Hazards
Flash point	141 °C (286 °F; 414 K)
Safety data sheet (SDS)	External MSDS
- Except where otherwise noted, data are given for materials in their standard state (at 25 °C [77 °F], 100 kPa). verify (what is ?) Infobox references

Benzanilide is the organic compound with the formula C_{6}H_{5}C(O)NHC_{6}H_{5}. It is a white solid. Commercially available, it may be prepared by the distillation of a mixture of benzoic acid and aniline.
