= Semiquinone =

Chemical compound

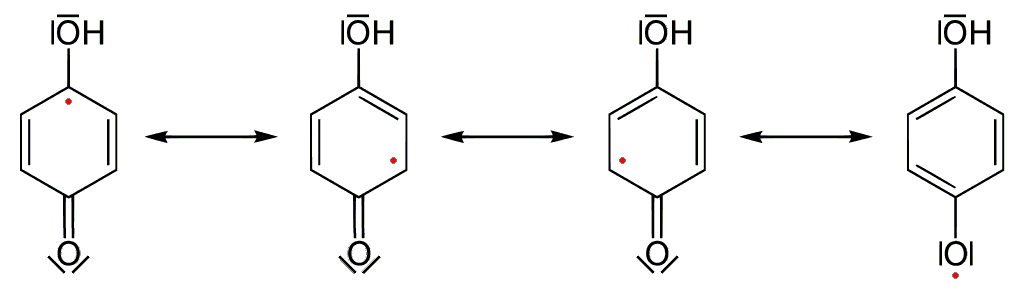
Resonance structures of a semiquinone

Semiquinones (or ubisemiquinones, if their origin is ubiquinone) are free radicals resulting from the removal of one hydrogen atom with its electron during the process of dehydrogenation of a hydroquinone, such as hydroquinone itself or catechol, to a quinone or alternatively the addition of a single hydrogen atom with its electron to a quinone. Semiquinones are highly unstable.

E.g. ubisemiquinone is the first of two stages in reducing the supplementary form of CoQ_{10} (ubiquinone) to its active form ubiquinol.
