= Fumaric acid =

Organic compound

- Skeletal formula of fumaric acid

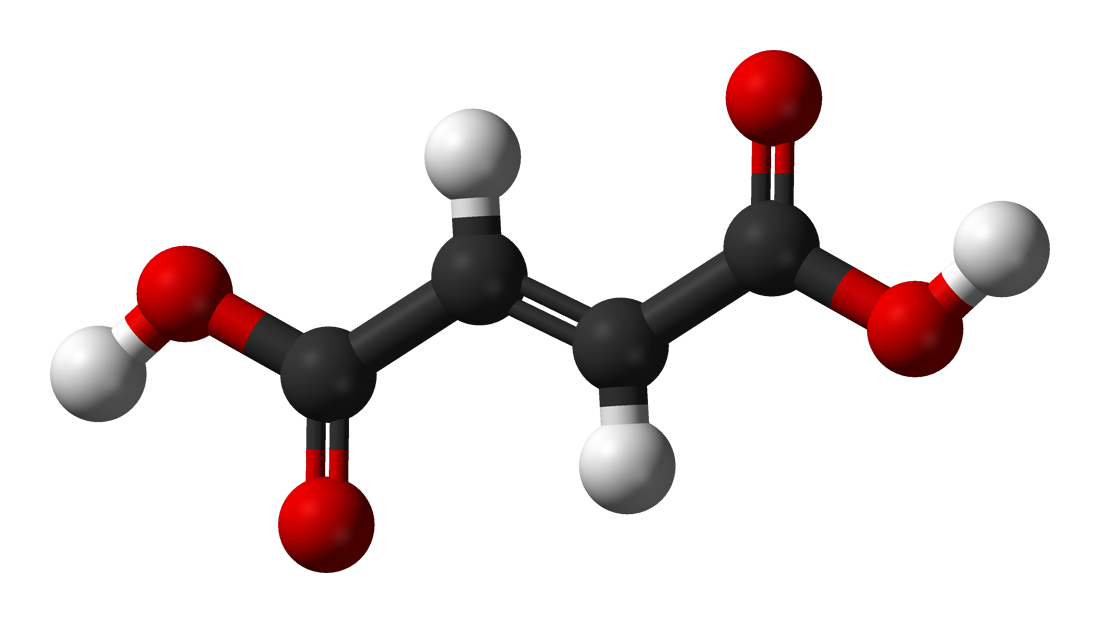
- Ball-and-stick model of the fumaric acid molecule

Names
- Preferred IUPAC name (2E)-But-2-enedioic acid
- Other names: Fumaric acid; trans-1,2-Ethylenedicarboxylic acid; 2-Butenedioic acid; trans-Butenedioic acid; Allomaleic acid; Boletic acid; Donitic acid; Lichenic acid

Identifiers
CAS Number	110-17-8
3D model (JSmol)	Interactive image
Beilstein Reference	605763
ChEBI	CHEBI:18012
ChEMBL	ChEMBL503160
ChemSpider	10197150
DrugBank	DB04299
ECHA InfoCard	100.003.404
EC Number	203-743-0
E number	E297 (preservatives)
Gmelin Reference	49855
KEGG	C00122
PubChem CID	444972
RTECS number	LS9625000
UNII	88XHZ13131
UN number	9126
CompTox Dashboard (EPA)	DTXSID3021518
- InChI: InChI=1S/C4H4O4/c5-3(6)1-2-4(7)8/h1-2H,(H,5,6)(H,7,8)/b2-1+ Key: VZCYOOQTPOCHFL-OWOJBTEDSA-N; InChI=1/C4H4O4/c5-3(6)1-2-4(7)8/h1-2H,(H,5,6)(H,7,8)/b2-1+ Key: VZCYOOQTPOCHFL-OWOJBTEDBF
- SMILES: C(=C/C(=O)O)\C(=O)O

Properties
Chemical formula	C_{4}H_{4}O_{4}
Molar mass	116.072 g·mol^{−1}
Appearance	White solid
Density	1.635 g/cm^{3}
Melting point	287 °C (549 °F; 560 K) (decomposes)
Solubility in water	6.3 g/L at 25 °C
Acidity (pK_{a})	pk_{a1} = 3.03, pk_{a2} = 4.44 (15 °C, cis isomer)
Magnetic susceptibility (χ)	−49.11·10^{−6} cm^{3}/mol
Dipole moment	non zero

Pharmacology
ATC code	D05AX01 (WHO)

Hazards
- GHS labelling
Pictograms	(GHS07: Exclamation mark)
Signal word	Warning
Hazard statements	H319
Precautionary statements	P264, P280, P305+P351+P338, P313
NFPA 704 (fire diamond)	2 1 0
Autoignition temperature	375 °C (707 °F; 648 K)

Related compounds
Related carboxylic acids	Maleic acid; Succinic acid; Crotonic acid
Related compounds	Fumaryl chloride; Fumaronitrile; Dimethyl fumarate; Ammonium fumarate; Iron(II) fumarate
- Except where otherwise noted, data are given for materials in their standard state (at 25 °C [77 °F], 100 kPa). verify (what is ?) Infobox references

Fumaric acid or trans-butenedioic acid is an organic compound with the formula HO_{2}CCH=CHCO_{2}H. A white solid, fumaric acid occurs widely in nature. It has a fruit-like taste and has been used as a food additive. Its E number is E297. The salts and esters are known as fumarates. Fumarate can also refer to the C_{4}H_{2}O^{2−}_{4} ion (in solution). Fumaric acid is the trans isomer of butenedioic acid, while maleic acid is the cis isomer.

== Biosynthesis and occurrence ==
It is produced in eukaryotic organisms from succinate in complex 2 of the electron transport chain via the enzyme succinate dehydrogenase.

Fumaric acid is found in fumitory (Fumaria officinalis), bolete mushrooms (specifically Boletus fomentarius var. pseudo-igniarius), lichen, and Iceland moss.

Fumarate is an intermediate in the citric acid cycle used by cells to produce energy in the form of adenosine triphosphate (ATP) from food. It is formed by the oxidation of succinate by the enzyme succinate dehydrogenase. Fumarate is then converted by the enzyme fumarase to malate.

Human skin naturally produces fumaric acid when exposed to sunlight.

Fumarate is also a product of the urea cycle.

Click on genes, proteins and metabolites below to link to respective articles. (Note: The interactive pathway map can be edited at WikiPathways: "TCACycle_WP78".)

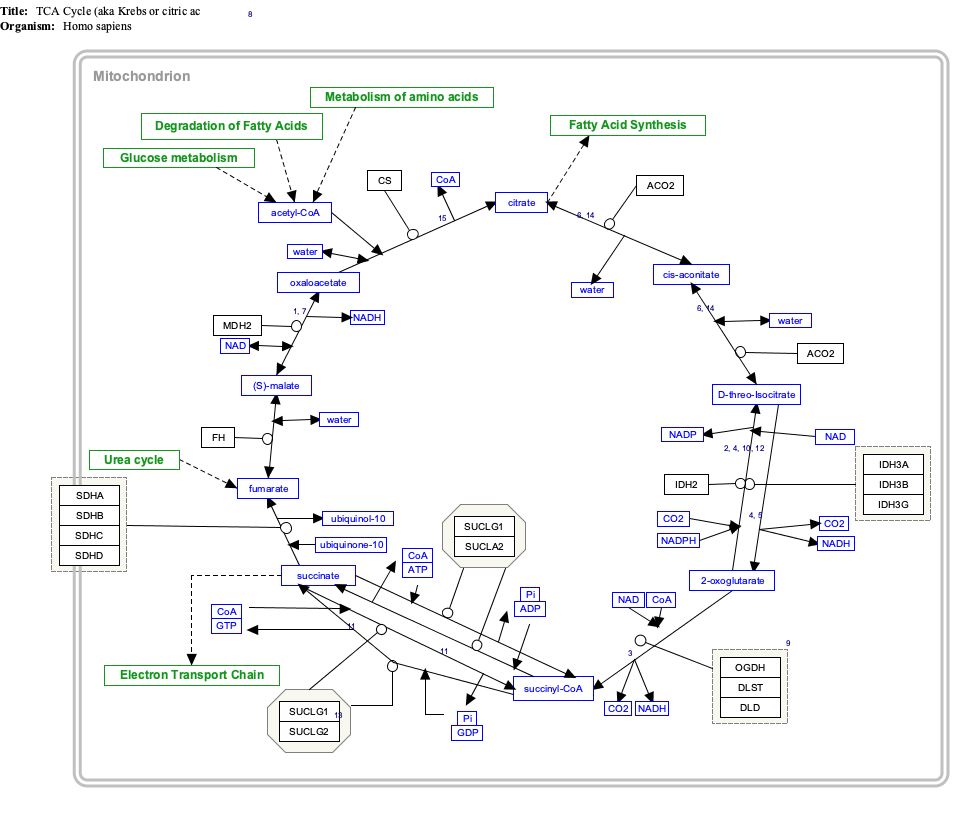

TCACycle_WP78 edit

== Uses ==
=== Food ===
Fumaric acid has been used as a food acidulant since 1946. It is approved for use as a food additive in the EU, USA, Australia, and New Zealand. As a food additive, it is used as an acidity regulator and can be denoted by the E number E297. It is generally used in beverages and baking powders for which requirements are placed on purity. Fumaric acid is used in the making of wheat tortillas as a food preservative and as the acid in leavening. It is generally used as a substitute for tartaric acid and occasionally in place of citric acid, at a rate of 1 g of fumaric acid to every ~1.5 g of citric acid, in order to add sourness, similarly to the way malic acid is used. As well as being a component of some artificial vinegar flavors, such as "Salt and Vinegar" flavored potato chips, it is also used as a coagulant in stove-top pudding mixes.

The European Commission Scientific Committee on Animal Nutrition, part of DG Health, found in 2014 that fumaric acid is "practically non-toxic" but high doses are likely nephrotoxic after long-term use.

=== Medicine ===
Fumaric acid was developed as a medicine to treat the autoimmune condition psoriasis in the 1950s in Germany as a tablet containing 3 esters, primarily dimethyl fumarate, and marketed as Fumaderm by Biogen Idec in Europe. Biogen later developed the main ester, dimethyl fumarate, as a treatment for multiple sclerosis.

In patients with relapsing-remitting multiple sclerosis, the ester dimethyl fumarate (BG-12, Biogen) significantly reduced relapse and disability progression in a phase 3 trial. It activates the Nrf2 antioxidant response pathway, the primary cellular defense against the cytotoxic effects of oxidative stress.

=== Other uses ===
Fumaric acid is used in the manufacture of polyester resins and polyhydric alcohols and as a mordant for dyes.

Fumaric acid can be used to make 6-methylcoumarin.

When fumaric acid is added to their feed, lambs produce up to 70% less methane during digestion.

== Synthesis ==
Fumaric acid is produced based on catalytic isomerisation of maleic acid in aqueous solutions at low pH. It precipitates from the reaction solution. Maleic acid is accessible in large volumes as a hydrolysis product of maleic anhydride, produced by catalytic oxidation of benzene or butane.

=== Historic and laboratory routes ===
Fumaric acid was first prepared from succinic acid. A traditional synthesis involves oxidation of furfural (from the processing of maize) using chlorate in the presence of a vanadium-based catalyst.

== Reactions ==
The chemical properties of fumaric acid can be anticipated from its component functional groups. This weak acid forms a diester, it undergoes bromination across the double bond, and it is a good dienophile.

== Safety ==
The oral LD_{50} is 10 g/kg.

== See also ==
- Citric acid cycle (TCA cycle)
- Fumarate reductase
- Photosynthesis
- Maleic acid, the cis isomer of fumaric acid
- Succinic acid
