= Ubiquinol =

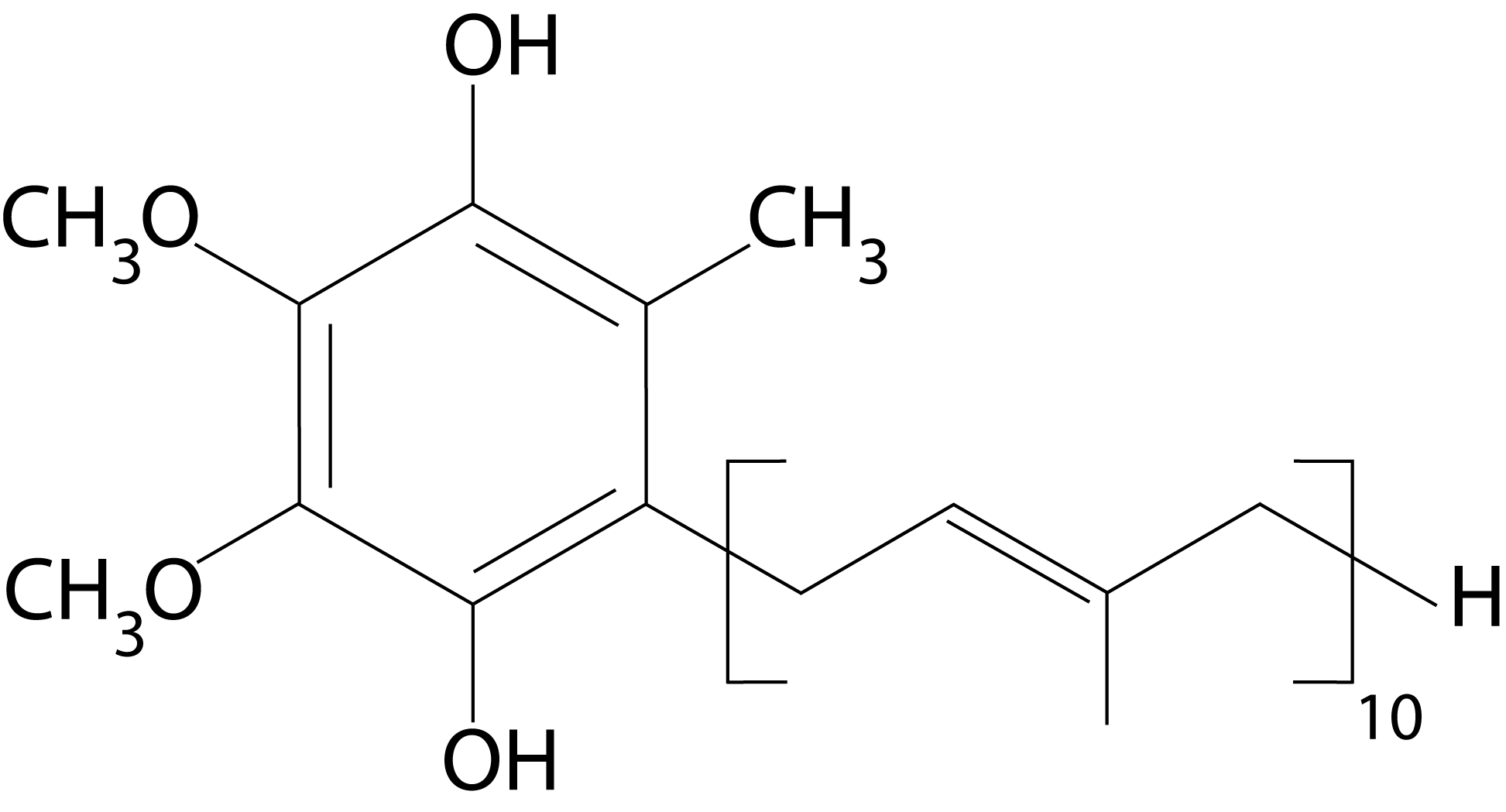

Names
- IUPAC name 2-[(2E,6E,10E,14E,18E,22E,26E,30E,34E)-3,7,11,15,19,23,27,31,35,39-decamethyltetraconta-2,6,10,14,18,22,26,30,34,38-decaenyl]-5,6-dimethoxy-3-methyl-benzene-1,4-diol
- Other names Reduced CoQ_{10}, unoxidized CoQ_{10}, CoQ_{10}H_{2}, or dihydroquinone

Identifiers
CAS Number	992-78-9
3D model (JSmol)	Interactive image
ChemSpider	17216048
MeSH	C003741
PubChem CID	9962735
UNII	M9NL0C577Y
CompTox Dashboard (EPA)	DTXSID90912840
- InChI: InChI=1S/C49H78O4/c1-36(2)20-13-21-37(3)22-14-23-38(4)24-15-25-39(5)26-16-27-40(6)28-17-29-41(7)30-18-31-42(8)32-19-33-43(9)34-35-45-44(10)46(50)48(52-11)49(53-12)47(45)51/h20,22,24,26,28,30,32,34,46-47,50-51H,13-19,21,23,25,27,29,31,33,35H2,1-12H3/b37-22+,38-24+,39-26+,40-28+,41-30+,42-32+,43-34+ Key: FLVUMORHBJZINO-SGHXUWJISA-N
- SMILES: CC1=C(C(C(=C(C1O)OC)OC)O)C/C=C(\C)/CC/C=C(\C)/CC/C=C(\C)/CC/C=C(\C)/CC/C=C(\C)/CC/C=C(\C)/CC/C=C(\C)/CCC=C(C)C

Properties
Chemical formula	C_{59}H_{92}O_{4}
Molar mass	865.381 g·mol^{−1}
Appearance	off-white powder
Melting point	45.6 °C (114.1 °F; 318.8 K)
Solubility in water	practically insoluble in water
- Except where otherwise noted, data are given for materials in their standard state (at 25 °C [77 °F], 100 kPa). verify (what is ?) Infobox references

A ubiquinol is an electron-rich (reduced) form of coenzyme Q (ubiquinone). The term most often refers to ubiquinol-10, with a 10-unit tail most commonly found in humans.

The natural ubiquinol form of coenzyme Q is 2,3-dimethoxy-5-methyl-6-poly prenyl-1,4-benzoquinol, where the polyprenylated side-chain is 9-10 units long in mammals. Coenzyme Q_{10} (CoQ_{10}) exists in three redox states, fully oxidized (ubiquinone), partially reduced (semiquinone or ubisemiquinone), and fully reduced (ubiquinol). The redox functions of ubiquinol in cellular energy production and antioxidant protection are based on the ability to exchange two electrons in a redox cycle between ubiquinol (reduced) and the ubiquinone (oxidized) form.

== Characteristics ==
Because humans can synthesize ubiquinol, it is not classed as a vitamin.

== Bioavailability ==
CoQ_{10} is not well absorbed into the body. Since the ubiquinol form has two additional hydrogens, it results in the conversion of two ketone groups into hydroxyl groups on the active portion of the molecule. This causes an increase in the polarity of the CoQ_{10} molecule and may be a significant factor behind the observed enhanced bioavailability of ubiquinol.

== Health effects ==
=== Blood pressure ===
Studies have shown that Ubiquinol, coenzyme Q10 (CoQ10), may reduce systolic blood pressure in adults. A 2025 meta-analysis of randomized controlled trials published in the International Journal of Cardiology Cardiovascular Risk and Prevention concluded that a daily dose of CoQ10 below 200 mg may be an effective adjunctive therapy for the reduction in systolic blood pressure (SBP).

A meta-analysis published in the academic journal Advances in Nutrition assessed CoQ10 dosing to lower systolic blood pressure in patients with Cardiometabolic Disorders. The assessment included 1,831 individuals across 26 studies. Conclusions showed that CoQ10 supplements may be potentially effective for clinically reducing SBP in people with cardiometabolic disorders, such as Type 2 diabetes or Dyslipidemia. The dose recommended was 100 – 200mg per day.

== Content in foods ==
Varying amounts of ubiquinol are found in different types of food. An analysis of a range of foods found ubiquinol to be present in 66 out of 70 items and accounted for 46% of the total coenzyme Q10 intake in the Japanese diet. The following chart is a sample of the results.

Food	Ubiquinol (μg/g)	Ubiquinone (μg/g)
Beef (shoulder)	5.36	25
Beef (liver)	40.1	0.4
Pork (shoulder)	25.4	19.6
Pork (thigh)	2.63	11.2
Chicken (breast)	13.8	3.24
Mackerel	0.52	10.1
Tuna (canned)	14.6	0.29
Yellowtail	20.9	12.5
Broccoli	3.83	3.17
Parsley	5.91	1.57
Orange	0.88	0.14

== Molecular aspects ==
Ubiquinol is a benzoquinol and is the reduced product of ubiquinone also called coenzyme Q_{10}. Its tail consists of 10 isoprene units.

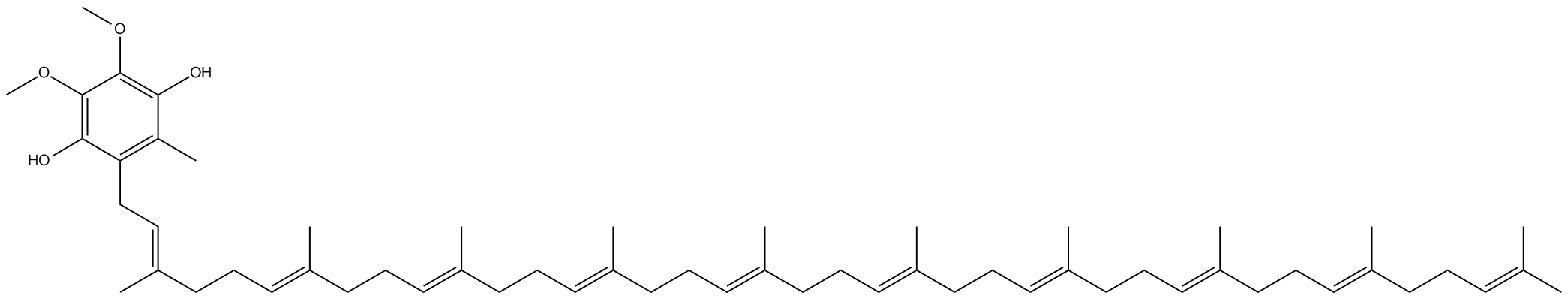
Ubiquinol

The reduction of ubiquinone to ubiquinol occurs in Complexes I & II in the electron transfer chain. The Q cycle is a process that occurs in cytochrome b, a component of Complex III in the electron transport chain, and that converts ubiquinol to ubiquinone in a cyclic fashion. When ubiquinol binds to cytochrome b, the pKa of the phenolic group decreases so that the proton ionizes and the phenoxide anion is formed.

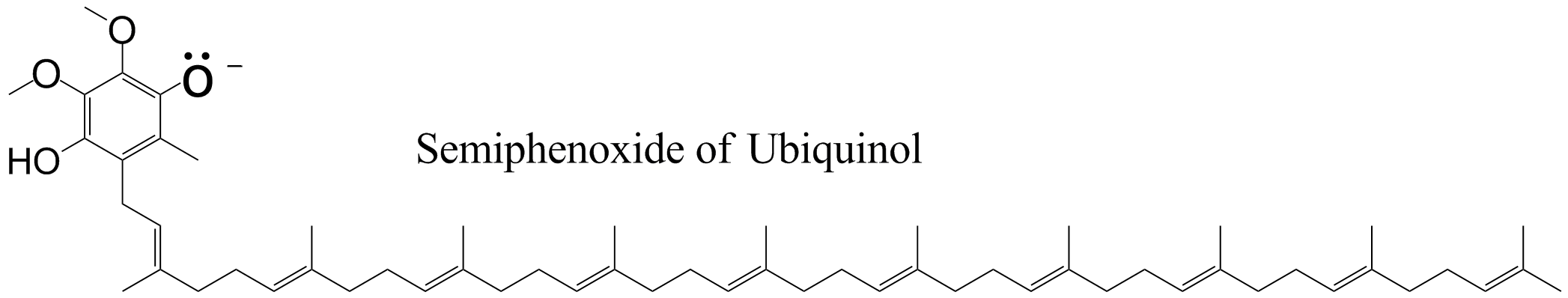
Ubiquinol, semiphenoxide

If the phenoxide oxygen is oxidized, the semiquinone is formed with the unpaired electron being located on the ring.

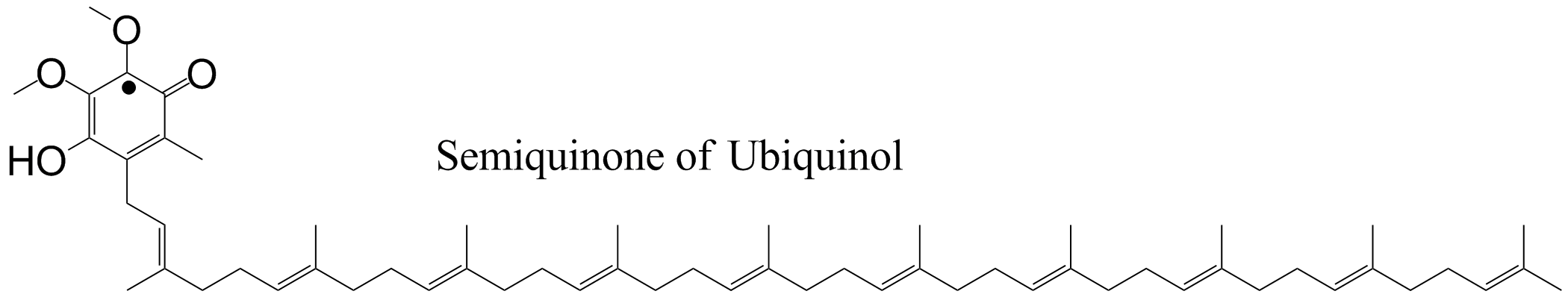
Ubiquinol
