= NADH-ubiquinone reductase =

NADH-ubiquinone reductase may refer to the following enzymes:

- NADH dehydrogenase
- NADH:ubiquinone reductase (non-electrogenic)
