= Reduced nicotinamide adenine dinucleotide-coenzyme Q reductase =

Reduced nicotinamide adenine dinucleotide-coenzyme Q reductase may stand for

- NADH dehydrogenase
- NADH:ubiquinone reductase (non-electrogenic)
