= NADH-coenzyme Q oxidoreductase =

NADH-coenzyme Q oxidoreductase may refer to:

- NADH dehydrogenase
- NADH:ubiquinone reductase (non-electrogenic)
