= NADH-CoQ reductase =

NADH-CoQ reductase may be:

- NADH dehydrogenase, an enzyme
- NADH:ubiquinone reductase (non-electrogenic), an enzyme
