= NADH-Q6 oxidoreductase =

NADH-Q6 oxidoreductase may refer to:

- NADH dehydrogenase, an enzyme
- NADH:ubiquinone reductase (non-electrogenic), an enzyme
