= DPNH-ubiquinone reductase =

DPNH-ubiquinone reductase may refer to the following enzymes:

- NADH dehydrogenase
- NADH:ubiquinone reductase (non-electrogenic)
