= Type 1 dehydrogenase =

Type 1 dehydrogenase may refer to:

- NADH dehydrogenase (quinone), an enzyme
- NADH dehydrogenase, an enzyme
