= COQ5 =

COQ5 may refer to:

- Coenzyme Q5, a chemical compound
- Coenzyme Q5, methyltransferase, an enzyme
