= NADH-CoQ oxidoreductase =

NADH-CoQ oxidoreductase may refer to:

- Respiratory complex I
- NADH dehydrogenase
- NADH:ubiquinone reductase (non-electrogenic)
