= Electron transfer complex I =

Electron transfer complex I may refer to:

- NADH dehydrogenase, an enzyme
- NADH:ubiquinone reductase (non-electrogenic), an enzyme
