= Coenzyme Q10 deficiency =

Coenzyme Q_{10} deficiency
- Other names: Leigh syndrome with nephrotic syndrome
- Ubiquinone

Coenzyme Q_{10} deficiency is a deficiency of coenzyme Q_{10}.

It can be associated with mutations in APTX, COQ2, COQ8A, COQ9, PDSS1, and PDSS2. Some forms may be more treatable than other mitochondrial diseases.
