= Vatiquinone =

Clinical data
- Other names: α-Tocotrienol quinone; Vincerenone; EPI-743; EPI743; PTC-743; PTC743
- Routes of administration: Oral
- Drug class: ALOX15 inhibitor; Antioxidant

Identifiers
- IUPAC name: 2-[(3R,6E,10E)-3-hydroxy-3,7,11,15-tetramethylhexadeca-6,10,14-trienyl]-3,5,6-trimethylcyclohexa-2,5-diene-1,4-dione
- CAS Number: 1213269-98-7
- PubChem CID: 46184405
- DrugBank: DB11917
- ChemSpider: 26632368
- UNII: 6O85FK9I0X
- KEGG: D10407
- ChEMBL: ChEMBL1812161
- CompTox Dashboard (EPA): DTXSID90153231

Chemical and physical data
- Formula: C_{29}H_{44}O_{3}
- Molar mass: 440.668 g·mol^{−1}
- 3D model (JSmol): Interactive image
- SMILES: CC1=C(C(=O)C(=C(C1=O)C)CC[C@@](C)(CC/C=C(\C)/CC/C=C(\C)/CCC=C(C)C)O)C
- InChI: InChI=1S/C29H44O3/c1-20(2)12-9-13-21(3)14-10-15-22(4)16-11-18-29(8,32)19-17-26-25(7)27(30)23(5)24(6)28(26)31/h12,14,16,32H,9-11,13,15,17-19H2,1-8H3/b21-14+,22-16+/t29-/m1/s1; Key:LNOVHERIIMJMDG-XZXLULOTSA-N

Vatiquinone (INN, USAN, JAN), also known as α-tocotrienol quinone or vincerenone and by its developmental code names EPI-743 and PTC-743, is a synthetic analogue of coenzyme Q10, antioxidant, and oxidoreductase inhibitor which is under development for the treatment of Friedreich's ataxia, mitochondrial disorders, epilepsy, Leigh disease, methylmalonic acidemia, noise-induced hearing loss, Parkinson's disease, Rett syndrome, and Tourette's syndrome. It is taken orally.

The drug inhibits 15-lipoxygenase (15-LOX; ALOX15) and/or other oxidoreductases, enzymes involved in inflammation, ferroptosis, and oxidative stress. It has also been described as a selective 15-LOX inhibitor however. The antioxidant activities of vatiquinone are said to be 1,000- to 10,000-fold greater than those of resveratrol, idebenone, or coenzyme Q10. Mitochondrial dysfunction results in excessive production of reactive oxygen and reactive nitrogen species, which causes redox imbalance and glutathione deficiency. Vatiquinone may increase intracellular glutathione levels and thereby theoretically improve redox balance to treat mitochondrial disorders.

Vatiquinone is or has been under development by Edison Pharmaceuticals and PTC Therapeutics, among other organizations. As of May 2026, it is in preregistration for Freidreich's ataxia, phase 3 clinical trials for mitochondrial disorders, phase 2/3 trials for epilepsy, and phase 2 trials for Leigh disease, methylmalonic acidemia, noise-induced hearing loss, Parkinson's disease, and Rett syndrome, whereas no recent development has been reported for Tourette's syndrome.

== See also ==
- List of investigational Parkinson's disease drugs
- List of investigational Tourette's syndrome drugs
- Utreloxastat (EPI-857; PTC-857)
- CU-13001
- Mitoquinone
