= Electron-transferring-flavoprotein dehydrogenase =

Protein family

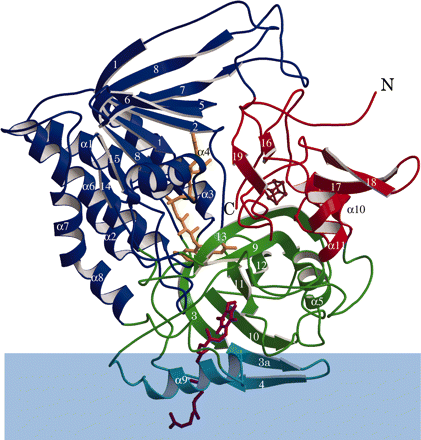
- Ribbon diagram of electron-transferring-flavoprotein dehydrogenase with each functional domain differentially colored. Blue band is membrane area.

Identifiers
- Symbol: ETFD
- Alt. symbols: ETF-QO
- NCBI gene: 2110
- HGNC: 3483
- OMIM: 231675
- PDB: 2GMH
- RefSeq: NM_004453
- UniProt: Q16134

Other data
- EC number: 1.5.5.1
- Locus: Chr. 4 q4q32.1
Search for
- Structures: Swiss-model
- Domains: InterPro

Electron-transferring-flavoprotein dehydrogenase (ETF dehydrogenase or electron transfer flavoprotein-ubiquinone oxidoreductase, EC 1.5.5.1) is an enzyme that transfers electrons from electron-transferring flavoprotein in the mitochondrial matrix, to the ubiquinone pool in the inner mitochondrial membrane. It is part of the electron transport chain. The enzyme is found in both prokaryotes and eukaryotes and contains a flavin and Fe-S cluster. In humans, it is encoded by the ETFDH gene. Deficiency in ETF dehydrogenase causes the human genetic disease multiple acyl-CoA dehydrogenase deficiency.

== Function ==
ETF-QO links the oxidation of fatty acids and some amino acids to oxidative phosphorylation in the mitochondria. Specifically, it catalyzes the transfer of electrons from electron transferring flavoprotein (ETF) to ubiquinone, reducing it to ubiquinol. The entire sequence of transfer reactions is as follows:

Acyl-CoA → Acyl-CoA dehydrogenase → ETF → ETF-QO → UQ → Complex III.

=== Catalyzed reaction ===
The overall reaction catalyzed by ETF-QO is as follows:

ETF-QO(reduced) + ubiquinone ↔ ETF-QO(oxidized) + ubiquinol

Enzymatic activity is usually assayed spectrophotometrically by reaction with octanoyl-CoA as the electron donor and ubiquinone-1 as the electron acceptor. The enzyme can also be assayed via disproportionation of ETF semiquinone. Both reactions are below:

Octanoyl-CoA + Q_{1} ↔ Q_{1}H_{2} + Oct-2-enoyl-CoA

2 ETF_{1-} ↔ ETF_{ox} + ETF_{2-}

=== Structure ===
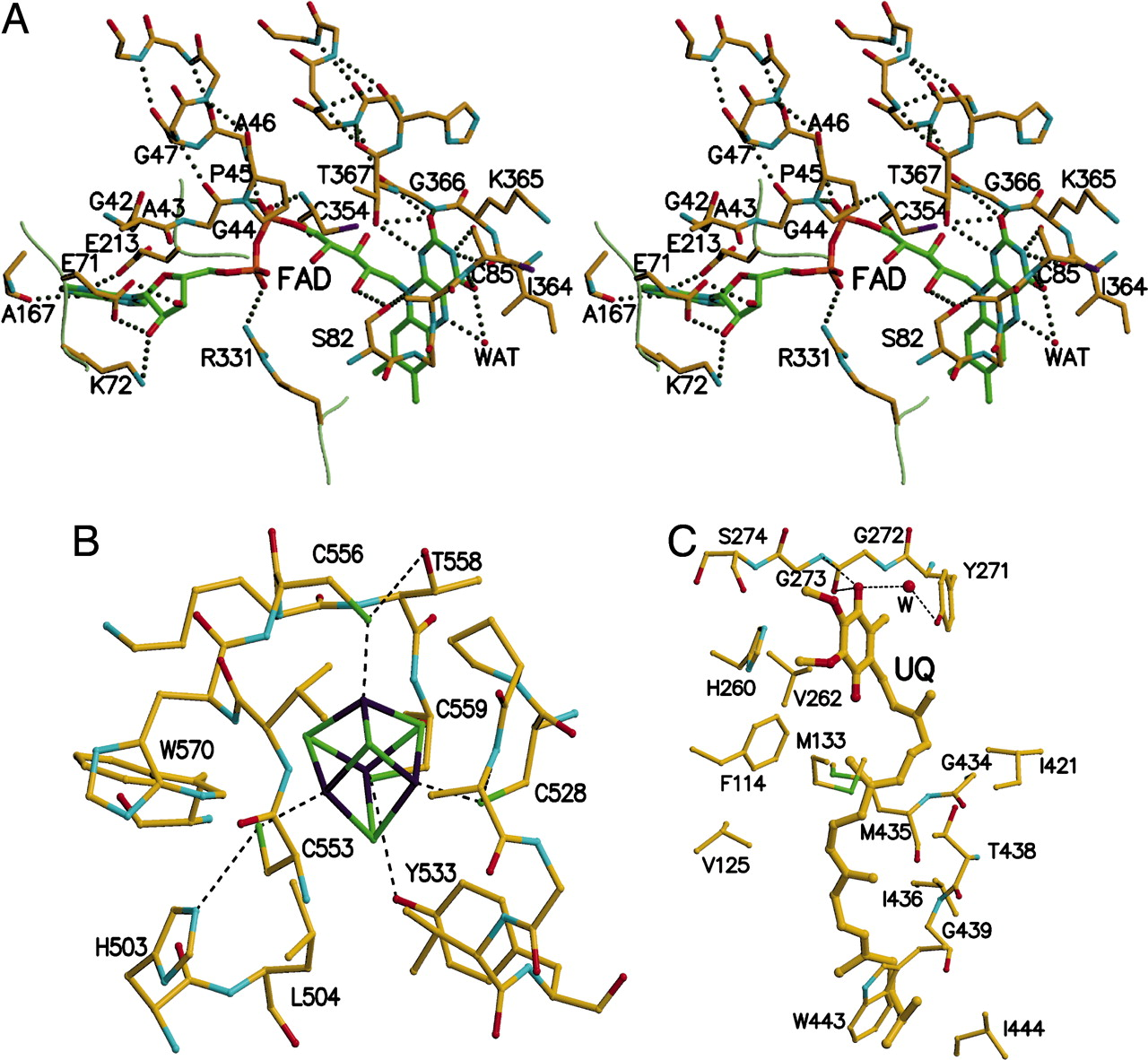
ETF-QO Functional Domains

ETF-QO consists of one structural domain with three functional domains packed in close proximity: a FAD domain, a 4Fe4S cluster domain, and a UQ-binding domain. FAD is in an extended conformation and is buried deeply within its functional domain. Multiple hydrogen bonds and a positive helix dipole modulate the redox potential of FAD and can possibly stabilize the anionic semiquinone intermediate. The 4Fe4S cluster is also stabilized by extensive hydrogen bonding around the cluster and its cysteine components. Ubiquinone binding is achieved through a deep hydrophobic binding pocket which is a different mode than other UQ-binding proteins such as succinate-Q oxidoreductase. Although ETF-QO is an integral membrane protein, it does not traverse the entire membrane unlike other UQ-binding proteins.

=== Mechanism ===
The exact mechanism for the reduction is unknown, although there are two hypothesized pathways. The first pathway is the transferral of electrons from one electron reduced ETF one at a time to the lower potential FAD center. One electron is transferred from the reduced FAD to the iron cluster, resulting in a two electron reduced state with one electron each on the FAD and cluster domains. Then, the bound ubiquinone is reduced to ubiquinol, at least transiently forming the singly reduced semiubiquinone. The second pathway involves the donation of electrons from ETF to the iron cluster, followed by internal transitions between the two electron centers. After equilibration, the rest of the pathway follows as above.

== Clinical significance ==
Deficiency of ETF-QO results in a disorder known as glutaric acidemia type II (also known as MADD for multiple acyl-CoA dehydrogenase deficiency), in which there is an improper buildup of fats and proteins in the body. Complications can involve acidosis or hypoglycemia, with other symptoms such as general weakness, liver enlargement, increased heart failure, and carnitine deficiency. More severe cases involve congenital defects and full metabolic crisis. Genetically, it is an autosomal recessive disorder, making its occurrence fairly rare. Most affected patients are the result of single point mutations around the FAD ubiquinone interface. Milder forms of the disorder have been responsive to riboflavin therapy and are coined riboflavin-responsive MADD (RR-MADD), although due to the varying mutations causing the disease treatment and symptoms can vary considerably.

== See also ==
- Oxidative phosphorylation
- Electron transport chain
- Microbial metabolism
- Metabolism
