= Dihydronicotinamide adenine dinucleotide-coenzyme Q reductase =

Dihydronicotinamide adenine dinucleotide-coenzyme Q reductase may refer to:

- NADH dehydrogenase
- NADH:ubiquinone reductase (non-electrogenic)
