= Caldalkalibacillus =

Scientific classification
- Domain: Bacteria
- Kingdom: Bacillati
- Phylum: Bacillota
- Class: Bacilli
- Order: Bacillales
- Family: Bacillaceae
- Genus: Caldalkalibacillus; Xue et al. 2006

Type species
- Caldalkalibacillus thermarum Xue et al. 2006

Species
- C. horti; C. mannanilyticus; "C. salinus"; C. thermarum; C. uzonensis

Synonyms
- Thermalkalibacillus Zhao et al. 2006

Genus of bacteria

Caldalkalibacillus is an aerobic and spore-forming genus of bacteria from the family Bacillaceae the stains either Gram-positive or Gram-variable. The type species of this genus is Caldalkalibacillus thermarum.

Caldalkalibacillus mannanilyticus was previously a species belonging to Bacillus, a genus that has been recognized as displaying extensive polyphyly and has been restricted by recent phylogenetic studies to only include species closely related to Bacillus subtilis and Bacillus cereus.

The name Caldalkalibacillus is derived from the prefix "-caldalkali" (from the Latin adjective caldus, which translates to "hot" and the Latin noun alkali), and the suffix "-bacillus" (from the Latin noun bacillus, referring to a small rod). Together, Caldalkalibacillus translates to bacillus living under hot and alkaline conditions).

== Biochemical characteristics and molecular signatures ==
Members of this genus are aerobic and some are motile and endospore-forming. Colonies formed are either yellow or yellowish-white in colour. Temperature range for growth is 20–65°C, with optimum growth temperature for C. mannanilyticus around 37°C, whereas C. thermarum grows optimally at 60°C. The pH range for growth is 7.5–10, with optimal growth occurring around pH 8.5–9.0.

Four conserved signature indels (CSIs) were identified through genomic analyses for this genus in the following proteins: prephenate dehydrogenase, isoprenyl transferase, DUF1027 domain-containing protein and adenine deaminase, which in most cases are exclusively shared by either all or most members of this genus. These CSIs provide a reliable molecular means of distinguishing Caldalkalibacillus species from other Bacillaceae genera and bacteria.

== Phylogeny ==
Caldalkalibacillus, as of May 2021, contains a total of 3 species with validly published names. This branching pattern is also observed in the Genome Taxonomy Database (GTDB).

16S rRNA based LTP_10_2024

- Caldalkalibacillales Caldalkalibacillaceae
  - Caldalkalibacillus
    - C. thermarum
    - C. uzonensis

- - Caldalkalibacillus mannanilyticus
  - Caldalkalibacillus horti

120 marker proteins based GTDB 09-RS220

- Caldalkalibacillales
  - Caldalkalibacillaceae Caldalkalibacillus
    - C. thermarum Xue et al. 2006
    - C. uzonensis Zhao et al. 2008
  - JCM‑10596 Caldalkalibacillus_A
    - Caldalkalibacillus mannanilyticus (Nogi et al. 2005) Gupta et al. 2020
    - - Caldalkalibacillus horti (Yumoto et al. 1998) Li et al. 2024
      - "Caldalkalibacillus salinus" Ouyang et al. 2022
