= (R)-benzylsuccinyl-CoA dehydrogenase =

Class of enzymes

Identifiers
- EC no.: 1.3.8.3

Databases
- BRENDA: enzyme data
- ExPASy: NiceZyme view
- KEGG: enzyme entry
- MetaCyc: metabolic pathway
- Rhea: reactions
- PDB structures: RCSB PDB PDBe PDBsum
Search
- PMC: articles
- PubMed: articles
- NCBI: proteins

(R)-benzylsuccinyl-CoA dehydrogenase (EC 1.3.8.3, BbsG, (R)-benzylsuccinyl-CoA:(acceptor) oxidoreductase) is an enzyme with systematic name (R)-benzylsuccinyl-CoA:electron transfer flavoprotein oxidoreductase. This enzyme catalyses the following chemical reaction

(R)-2-benzylsuccinyl-CoA + electron-transfer flavoprotein $\rightleftharpoons$ (E)-2-benzylidenesuccinyl-CoA + reduced electron-transfer flavoprotein

This enzyme requires FAD as prosthetic group.
