= 2-methyl-branched-chain-enoyl-CoA reductase =

Class of enzymes

Identifiers
- EC no.: 1.3.8.5
- CAS no.: 122320-06-3

Databases
- BRENDA: enzyme data
- ExPASy: NiceZyme view
- KEGG: enzyme entry
- MetaCyc: metabolic pathway
- Rhea: reactions
- PDB structures: RCSB PDB PDBe PDBsum
- Gene Ontology: AmiGO / QuickGO
Search
- PMC: articles
- PubMed: articles
- NCBI: proteins

In enzymology, a 2-methyl-branched-chain-enoyl-CoA reductase (EC 1.3.8.5) is an enzyme that catalyzes the chemical reaction

2-methylbutanoyl-CoA + electron transfer flavoprotein $\rightleftharpoons$ 2-methylcrotonoyl-CoA + reduced electron transfer flavoprotein + H^{+}

Thus, the two substrates of this enzyme are 2-methylbutanoyl-CoA and an electron transfer flavoprotein, whereas its 3 products are 2-methylcrotonoyl-CoA, reduced electron transfer flavoprotein, and H^{+}.

This enzyme belongs to the family of oxidoreductases, specifically those acting on the CH-CH group of donors with flavin as acceptor. The systematic name of this enzyme class is 2-methyl-branched-chain-acyl-CoA:electron-transfer flavoprotein 2-oxidoreductase . This enzyme participates in the degradation of isoleucine. It employs one cofactor, FAD.
