= COQ9 =

Protein-coding gene in humans

Available structures
PDB	Ortholog search: PDBe RCSB
PDB	List of PDB id codes 4RHP

Identifiers
- Aliases: COQ9, C16orf49, COQ10D5, coenzyme Q9
- External IDs: OMIM: 612837; MGI: 1915164; HomoloGene: 6477; GeneCards: COQ9; OMA:COQ9 - orthologs

Gene location (Human)
Chr.	Chromosome 16 (human)
Band	16q21	Start	57,447,425 bp
Band	16q21	End	57,461,270 bp

Gene location (Mouse)
Chr.	Chromosome 8 (mouse)
Band	8|8 C5	Start	95,564,949 bp
Band	8|8 C5	End	95,581,523 bp
RNA expression pattern
Bgee	Human / Mouse (ortholog); Top expressed in: apex of heart; muscle of thigh; gastrocnemius muscle; mucosa of transverse colon; right auricle of heart; rectum; muscle layer of sigmoid colon; right adrenal cortex; right lobe of liver; right lobe of thyroid gland / Top expressed in: myocardium of ventricle; sternocleidomastoid muscle; digastric muscle; interventricular septum; triceps brachii muscle; cardiac muscle tissue of left ventricle; temporal muscle; soleus muscle; muscle of thigh; thoracic diaphragm; More reference expression data
BioGPS	n/a
Gene ontology
Molecular function	protein binding; protein homodimerization activity; lipid binding
Cellular component	mitochondrial inner membrane; mitochondrion
Biological process	ubiquinone biosynthetic process; mitochondrial electron transport, NADH to ubiquinone
Sources:Amigo / QuickGO
Orthologs
Species	Human	Mouse
Entrez	57017	67914
Ensembl	ENSG00000088682	ENSMUSG00000031782
UniProt	O75208	Q8K1Z0
RefSeq (mRNA)	NM_020312	NM_026452
RefSeq (protein)	NP_064708	NP_080728
Location (UCSC)	Chr 16: 57.45 – 57.46 Mb	Chr 8: 95.56 – 95.58 Mb
PubMed search
- Wikidata
View/Edit Human	View/Edit Mouse

Ubiquinone biosynthesis protein COQ9, mitochondrial, also known as coenzyme Q9 homolog (COQ9), is a protein that in humans is encoded by the COQ9 gene.

== Function ==
This locus represents a mitochondrial ubiquinone biosynthesis gene. The encoded protein is likely necessary for biosynthesis of coenzyme Q10, as mutations at this locus have been associated with autosomal-recessive neonatal-onset primary coenzyme Q10 deficiency.

== Clinical significance ==
It may be associated with Coenzyme Q10 deficiency.
