= ETFB =

Protein-coding gene in humans

Available structures
PDB	Ortholog search: PDBe RCSB
PDB	List of PDB id codes 1EFV, 1T9G, 2A1T, 2A1U

Identifiers
- Aliases: ETFB, MADD, FP585, electron transfer flavoprotein beta subunit, electron transfer flavoprotein subunit beta
- External IDs: OMIM: 130410; MGI: 106098; HomoloGene: 1503; GeneCards: ETFB; OMA:ETFB - orthologs

Gene location (Human)
Chr.	Chromosome 19 (human)
Band	19q13.41	Start	51,345,169 bp
Band	19q13.41	End	51,366,388 bp

Gene location (Mouse)
Chr.	Chromosome 7 (mouse)
Band	7 B3|7 28.25 cM	Start	43,093,507 bp
Band	7 B3|7 28.25 cM	End	43,107,224 bp
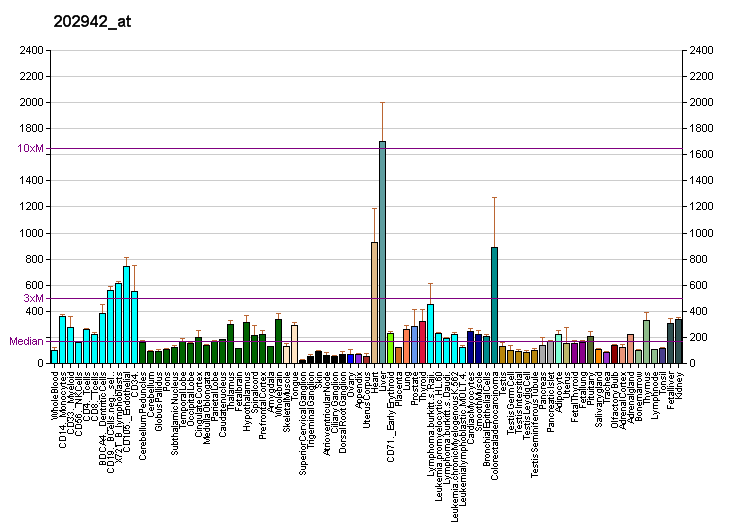
RNA expression pattern
Bgee	Human / Mouse (ortholog); Top expressed in: apex of heart; right lobe of liver; left ventricle; right auricle of heart; right adrenal gland; left adrenal gland; right adrenal cortex; mucosa of transverse colon; left adrenal cortex; C1 segment / Top expressed in: proximal tubule; right kidney; human kidney; heart; lens; blastocyst; white adipose tissue; muscle tissue; skeletal muscle tissue; muscle of thigh; More reference expression data
BioGPS	More reference expression data
Gene ontology
Molecular function	electron transfer activity; protein binding
Cellular component	mitochondrial matrix; cytosol; mitochondrion
Biological process	fatty acid beta-oxidation using acyl-CoA dehydrogenase; electron transport chain; respiratory electron transport chain
Sources:Amigo / QuickGO
Orthologs
Species	Human	Mouse
Entrez	2109	110826
Ensembl	ENSG00000105379	ENSMUSG00000004610
UniProt	P38117	Q9DCW4
RefSeq (mRNA)	NM_001985; NM_001014763	NM_026695
RefSeq (protein)	NP_001014763; NP_001976	NP_080971
Location (UCSC)	Chr 19: 51.35 – 51.37 Mb	Chr 7: 43.09 – 43.11 Mb
PubMed search
- Wikidata
View/Edit Human	View/Edit Mouse

The human ETFB gene encodes the Electron-transfer-flavoprotein, beta subunit, also known as ETF-β. Together with Electron-transfer-flavoprotein, alpha subunit, encoded by the 'ETFA' gene, it forms the heterodimeric Electron transfer flavoprotein (ETF). The native ETF protein contains one molecule of FAD and one molecule of AMP, respectively.

First reports on the ETF protein were based on ETF isolated from porcine liver. Porcine and human ETF transfer electrons from mitochondrial matrix flavoenzymes to Electron transfer flavoprotein-ubiquinone oxidoreductase (ETF-QO) encoded by the ETFDH gene. ETF-QO subsequently relays the electrons via ubiquinone to complex III in the respiratory chain. The flavoenzymes that transfer electrons to ETF are involved in fatty acid beta oxidation, amino acid catabolism, choline metabolism, and special metabolic pathways. Defects in either of the ETF subunits or ETFDH cause multiple acyl CoA dehydrogenase deficiency (OMIM # 231680), earlier called glutaric acidemia type II. MADD is characterized by excretion of a series of substrates of the upstream flavoenzymes, e.g. glutaric, lactic, ethylmalonic, butyric, isobutyric, 2-methyl-butyric, and isovaleric acids.

== Evolutionary relationships ==
ETF is an evolutionarily ancient protein with orthologues found in all kingdoms of life. ETFs are grouped into 3 subgroups, I, II, and III. The best studied group are group I ETFs that in eukaryotic cells are localized in the mitochondrial matrix space. Group I ETFs transfer electrons between flavoenzymes. Group II ETFs may also receive electrons from ferredoxin or NADH.

== Gene, expression, and subcellular localization ==
The human ETFB gene encoding the beta subunit of ETF (ETF-β) is localized on chromosome 19 (19q13.3). It is composed of 6 exons. Little is known about its promoter and transcriptional regulation. Global expression analyses show that it is expressed at substantial levels in most tissues (PROTEOMICXS DB). ETF-β is posttranslationally imported into the mitochondrial matrix space, but it does not have a cleaved N-terminal mitochondrial targeting sequence.

== Posttranslational modifications and regulation ==
Acetylation and succinylation of lysine residues and phosphorylation of serine and threonine residues in ETF-β have been reported in mass spectrometric analyses of posttranslational modifications P13804. Trimethylation of two lysines, Lys-200 and Lys-203, in ETF-β has been indicated to affect ETF activity. Electron transfer flavoprotein regulatory factor 1 (ETFRF1) has been identified as a protein that specifically binds ETF and this interaction has been indicated to inactivate ETF by displacing the FAD.

== Structure and interaction with redox partners ==
As first shown for porcine ETF, one chain of ETF-β assembles with one chain of ETF-α, and one molecule each of FAD and AMP to the dimeric native enzyme. The crystal structure of human ETF was reported in 1996. This showed that ETF consists of three distinct domains (I, II, and III). The FAD is bound in a cleft between the two subunits and interacts mainly with the C-terminal part of ETF-α. The AMP is buried in domain III. A crystal structure of the complex of one of its interactors, medium-chain acyl-CoA dehydrogenase (MCAD; gene name ACADM) has been determined. This identified a so-called recognition loop formed by ETF-β that anchors ETF on one subunit of the homotetrameric MCAD enzyme. This interaction triggers conformational changes and the highly mobile redox active FAD domain of ETF swings to the FAD domain of a neighboring subunit of the MCAD tetramer bringing the two FAD molecules into close contact for interprotein electron transfer.

== Molecular Function ==
Human ETF receives electrons from at least 14 flavoenzymes and transfers them to ETF-ubiquinone oxidoreductases (ETF:QO) in the inner mitochondrial membrane. ETF:QO in turn relays them to ubiquinone from where they enter the respiratory chain at complex III. Most of the flavoenzymes transferring electrons to ETF are participating in fatty acid oxidation, amino acid catabolism, and choline metabolism. ETF and ETF:QO thus represent an important hub for transfer of electrons from various redox reactions and feeding them into the respiratory chain for energy production.

== Genetic deficiencies and molecular pathogenesis ==
Deleterious mutations in the ETFB and ETFA genes encoding ETF or the ETFDH gene encoding ETF:QO are associated with multiple acyl-CoA dehydrogenase deficiency (MADD; OMIM #231680; previously called glutaric aciduria type II). Biochemically, MADD is characterized by elevated levels of a series of carnitine conjugates of the substrates of the different partner dehydrogenases of the ETF/ETF:QO hub, e.g. glutaric, lactic, ethylmalonic, butyric, isobutyric, 2-methyl-butyric, and isovaleric acids. Accumulation of substrates and derivatives of the upstream dehydrogenases and energy deficiency upon fasting cause the clinical phenotype. Mostly depending on the severity of the mutation, the disease is divided into three subgroups: type I (neonatal onset with congenital anomalies), type II (neonatal onset without congenital anomalies), and type III (late onset). There is no cure for the disease, and treatment is employing a diet limiting protein and fat intake, avoidance of prolonged fasting, both to alleviate the flow through the partner dehydrogenases. In addition, supplementation of riboflavin, the precursor of the FAD co-factor can stabilize mutant ETF and ETF:QO variants with certain missense mutations.
