= Glutaric acidemia type 2 =

- Other names: Multiple acyl-CoA dehydrogenase deficiency (MADD); Glutaric academia/aceduria type II (GA-II)
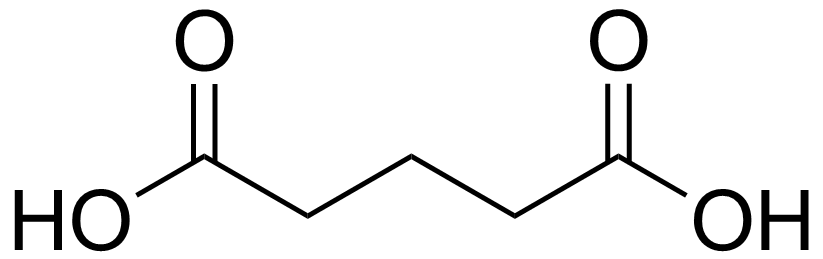
- Glutaric acid
- Specialty: Medical genetics

Glutaric acidemia type 2 is an autosomal recessive metabolic disorder that is characterised by defects in the ability of the body to use proteins and fats for energy. Incompletely processed proteins and fats can build up, leading to a dangerous chemical imbalance called acidosis. It is a metabolic myopathy, categorized under fatty acid metabolism disorder as that is the bioenergetic system that it affects the most. It also affects choline metabolism.

The phenotypic presentation has 3 forms: a neonatal-onset form with congenital anomalies (type I), a neonatal-onset form without congenital anomalies (type II), and a late-onset form (type III).

Individuals with glutaric acidemia type 2 frequently experience exercise-induced muscle fatigue, hypotonia, myalgia, and proximal muscle weakness. The symptoms not only overlap with another type of metabolic myopathy, that of mitochondrial myopathy, but MADD also impairs the FAD-dependent respiratory chain in the mitochondria of muscle cells, as well as some muscle biopsies showing COX-negative fibres and deficiency of coenzyme Q_{10}.

== Signs and symptoms ==
=== Type I (Neonatal onset with congenital anomalies) ===
Patients with this form of disorder experience symptoms after a few hours of birth, even before newborn blood spot test have been sent/results become available. Patients experience symptoms such as tachypnea, encephalopathy, hypotonia. Also they have congenital abnormalities such as hypospadias with/without chordee in males, single palmar creases, rocker-bottom feet; also they have abnormal facial features such as short nose with anteverted nares and long philtrum, tented upper lip, midface retrusion, high anterior hairline, wide nasal bridge. Cardiomyopathy, hepatomegaly, antenatal oligohydramnios, and renal malformations with large cystic kidneys can be seen. They also have hypoketotic hypoglycaemia, metabolic acidosis, and excretion and accumulation of metabolites, elevation of ammonia and AST/ALT levels, and hydroxyisovaleric acid excretion which causes 'sweaty feet' odour of urine.

=== Type II (Neonatal onset without congenital anomalies) ===
Symptoms are almost the same but patients don't have congenital anomalies and it is fatal.

=== Type III (Late onset) ===
Patients with this form of the disorder can be become symptomatic at 2 months of age, but the average age of symptoms debut is 19.2 years. Patients with late onset glutaric aciduria type 2 can experience myopathic symptoms such as exercise intolerance, muscle wasting, myalgia, and muscle weakness which affects proximal limbs; in some cases development respiratory insufficiency is possible. Muscle biopsy shows lipid storage. Rarely distal sensory neuropathy is reported in patients with this disorder.

One third of patients can experience metabolic decompensation which is caused by catabolic states (such as fever and infections) and can be life-threatening; in adult cases triggers can include valproate, alcohol, pregnancy/labor, surgery, weight-loss or low-energy diets. Symptoms include: rhabdomyolysis with raised creatine kinase levels, hyperammonemia, hypoglycemia, and acidosis.

== Genetics ==
Glutaric acidemia type 2 has an autosomal recessive pattern of inheritance.

Mutations in the ETFA, ETFB, and ETFDH genes cause glutaric acidemia type II. Mutations in these genes result in a deficiency in one of two enzymes that normally work together in the mitochondria, which are the energy-producing centers of cells. The ETFA and ETFB genes encode two subunits of the enzyme electron transfer flavoprotein, while the ETFDH gene encodes the enzyme electron-transferring-flavoprotein dehydrogenase. When one of these enzymes is defective or missing, the mitochondria cannot function normally, partially broken-down proteins and fats accumulate in the cells and damage them; this damage leads to the signs and symptoms of glutaric acidemia type II.

This condition is inherited in an autosomal recessive pattern, which means the defective gene is located on an autosome, and two copies of the gene – one from each parent – are needed to inherit the disorder. The parents of an individual with an autosomal recessive disorder are carriers of one copy of the defective gene, but do not show signs and symptoms of the disorder themselves.

== Diagnosis ==
Glutaric acidemia type 2 often appears in infancy as a sudden metabolic crisis, in which acidosis and low blood sugar (hypoglycemia) cause weakness, behavior changes, and vomiting. There may also be enlargement of the liver, heart failure, and a characteristic odor resembling that of sweaty feet. Some infants with glutaric acidemia type 2 have birth defects, including multiple fluid-filled growths in the kidneys (polycystic kidneys). Glutaric acidemia type 2 is a very rare disorder. Its precise incidence is unknown. It has been reported in several different ethnic groups.

== Treatment ==
It is important for patients with MADD to strictly avoid fasting to prevent hypoglycemia and crises of metabolic acidosis; for this reason, infants and small children should eat frequent meals. Patients with MADD can experience life-threatening metabolic crises precipitated by common childhood illnesses or other stresses on the body, so avoidance of such stresses is critical. Patients may be advised to follow a diet low in fat and protein and high in carbohydrates, particularly in severe cases. Depending on the subtype, riboflavin (100-400 mg/day), coenzyme Q10 (CoQ10), L-carnitine, or glycine supplements may be used to help restore energy production. Some small, uncontrolled studies have reported that racemic salts of beta-hydroxybutyrate (one of the ketone bodies) were helpful in patients with moderately severe disease; further research is needed.

== See also ==
- Glutaric acidemia type 1
- Riboflavin-responsive exercise intolerance - similar in biochemical features, also responsive to riboflavin
- Metabolic myopathy
