= PDSS2 =

Protein-coding gene in the species Homo sapiens

Identifiers
- Aliases: PDSS2, C6orf210, COQ10D3, DLP1, bA59I9.3, hDLP1, prenyl (decaprenyl) diphosphate synthase, subunit 2, decaprenyl diphosphate synthase subunit 2, COQ1B
- External IDs: OMIM: 610564; MGI: 1918615; HomoloGene: 56885; GeneCards: PDSS2; OMA:PDSS2 - orthologs

Gene location (Human)
Chr.	Chromosome 6 (human)
Band	6q21	Start	107,152,562 bp
Band	6q21	End	107,459,564 bp

Gene location (Mouse)
Chr.	Chromosome 10 (mouse)
Band	10 B2|10 22.91 cM	Start	43,097,482 bp
Band	10 B2|10 22.91 cM	End	43,340,878 bp
RNA expression pattern
Bgee	Human / Mouse (ortholog); Top expressed in: buccal mucosa cell; kidney tubule; secondary oocyte; tibia; glomerulus; metanephric glomerulus; gonad; visceral pleura; parietal pleura; endothelial cell / Top expressed in: zygote; secondary oocyte; tibialis anterior muscle; digastric muscle; vastus lateralis muscle; extraocular muscle; gastrocnemius muscle; myocardium of ventricle; sternocleidomastoid muscle; temporal muscle; More reference expression data
BioGPS	n/a
Gene ontology
Molecular function	transferase activity; trans-hexaprenyltranstransferase activity; protein heterodimerization activity
Cellular component	transferase complex; mitochondrial matrix; mitochondrion; cytosol
Biological process	ubiquinone biosynthetic process; protein heterotetramerization; regulation of body fluid levels; isoprenoid biosynthetic process
Sources:Amigo / QuickGO
Orthologs
Species	Human	Mouse
Entrez	57107	71365
Ensembl	ENSG00000164494	ENSMUSG00000038240
UniProt	Q86YH6	Q33DR3
RefSeq (mRNA)	NM_020381	NM_001168289; NM_027772
RefSeq (protein)	NP_065114	NP_001161761; NP_082048
Location (UCSC)	Chr 6: 107.15 – 107.46 Mb	Chr 10: 43.1 – 43.34 Mb
PubMed search
- Wikidata
View/Edit Human	View/Edit Mouse

Decaprenyl-diphosphate synthase subunit 2 (PDSS2) is a protein that in humans is encoded by the PDSS2 gene.

== Function ==
The protein encoded by this gene is an enzyme that synthesizes the prenyl side-chain of coenzyme Q, or ubiquinone, one of the key elements in the respiratory chain. The gene product catalyzes the formation of all trans-polyprenyl pyrophosphates from isopentyl diphosphate in the assembly of polyisoprenoid side chains, the first step in coenzyme Q biosynthesis.

== Clinical significance ==
It may be associated with Coenzyme Q10 deficiency.

== See also ==
- PDSS1
