= NDH-2 =

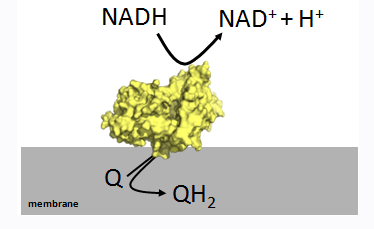
Enzymatic reaction catalyzed by NDH-2. In yellow is represented the protein surface, sitting in the membrane (in gray)

NDH-2, also known as type II NADH:quinone oxidoreductase or alternative NADH dehydrogenase, is an enzyme (EC: 1.6.99.3) which catalyzes the electron transfer from NADH (electron donor) to a quinone (electron acceptor), being part of the electron transport chain. NDH-2 are peripheral membrane protein, functioning as dimers in vivo, with approximately 45 KDa per subunit and a single FAD as their cofactor.

NDH-2 are the only enzymes with NADH dehydrogenase activity expressed in the respiratory chain of some pathogenic organisms (e.g. Staphylococcus aureus), and for that they have been proposed as new targets for rational drug design.

== Structure ==
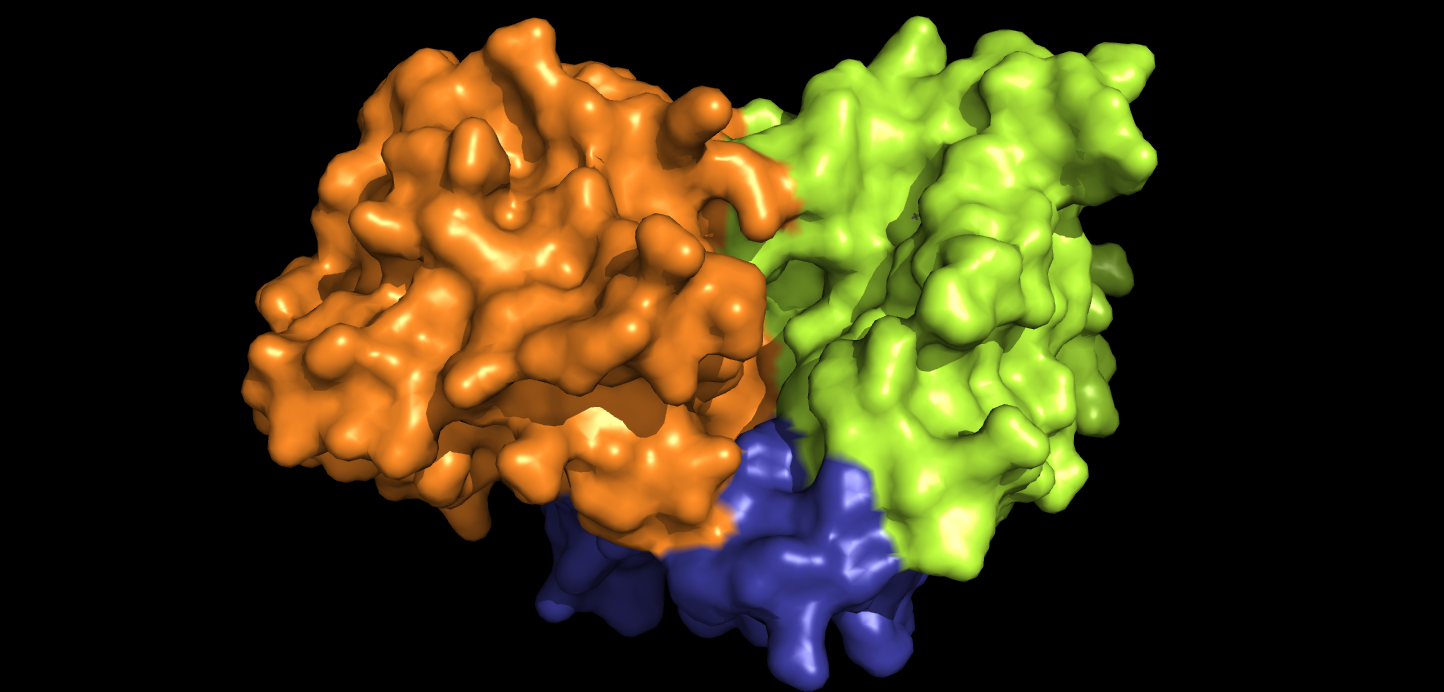
NDH-2 structure colored by domains

The structure/fold from these proteins may be divided into three domains: first dinucleotide binding domain (green in the figure), second dinucleotide binding domain (orange in the figure) and C-terminal domain (blue in the figure).

The first domain is responsible for the noncovalent binding of FAD, while the second dinucleotide binding domain binds NADH. Both these domain are structurally organized in Rossmann folds, with the characteristic GxGxxG motif present.

The third domain, C-terminal, is responsible for the protein-membrane interaction. Upon expression of a C-terminal truncated version of NDH-2, it was observed an intracellular delocalization from the membrane to the cytoplasm. The third domain, together with part of the first domain, is also partially responsible for the binding of the electron acceptor (quinone).

There are currently crystallographic structures for NDH-2 from four different organisms:

- Staphylococcus aureus (PDB ID:5NA4)
- Caldalkalibacillus thermarum (PDB ID:4NWZ)
- Saccharomyces cerevisiae (PDB ID:4G73)
- Plasmodium falciparum (PDB ID: 5JWB)

== Reaction ==
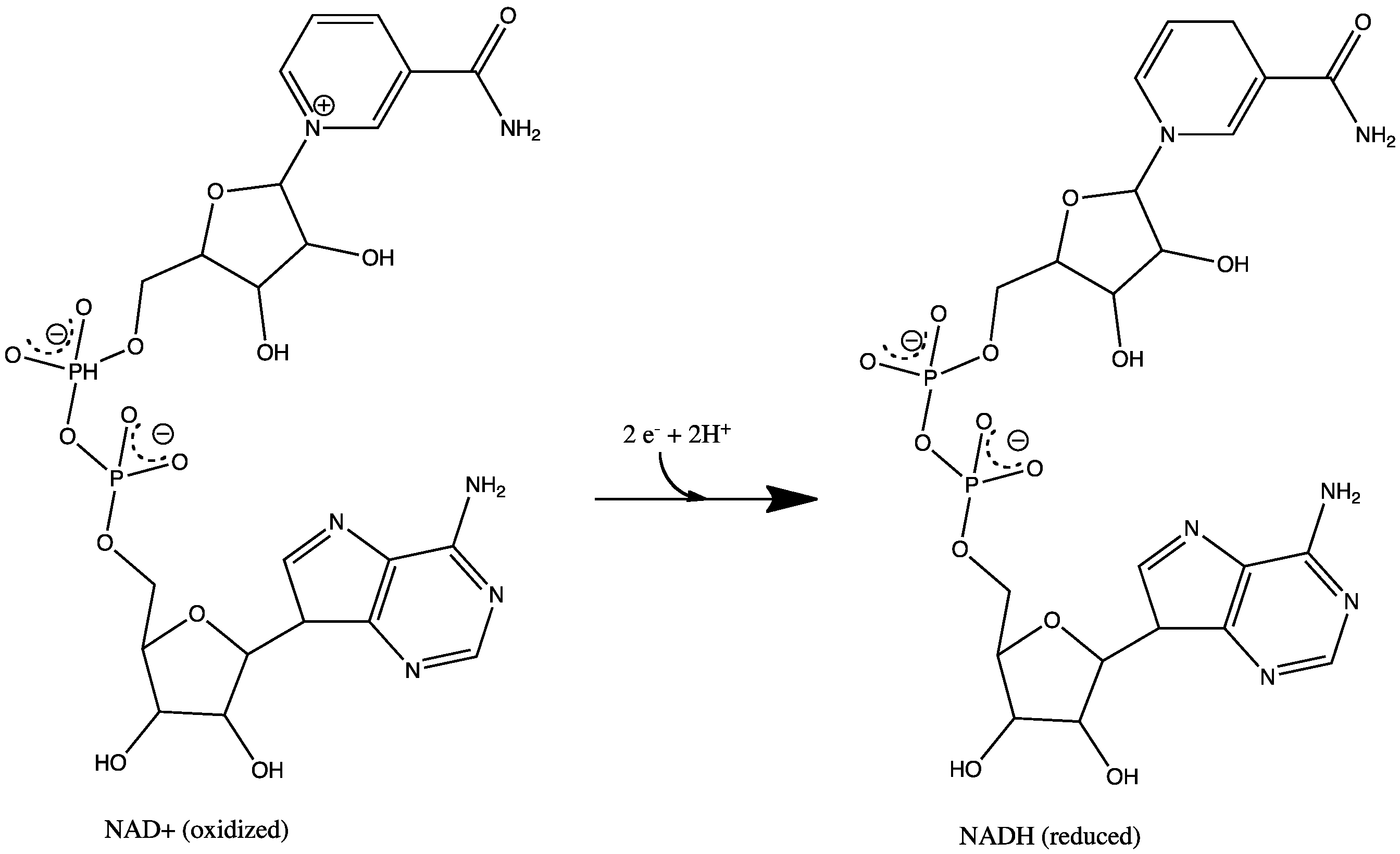
NAD+ to NADH

The enzymatic oxidoreduction reaction catalyzed by NDH-2 may be described as follows:

NADH + Q + H^{+} -----> NAD^{+} + QH_{2}

(Q - quinone; QH_{2} - quinol)

In this case, the electron donor is NADH and the electron acceptor is the quinone. Depending on the organism, the reduced quinone changes between menaquinone, ubiquinone or plastoquinone. The mechanism of the reaction may be divided in two half-reactions: 1stHR and 2ndHR.

In the 1stHR, 2 electrons and 1 proton from NADH are transferred (simultaneously with an additional proton from the bulk) to the prosthetic group (FAD), giving rise to its protonated form FADH_{2}. In this phase, an Enzyme-Substrate complex is established, characterized by the appearance of a "Charge-transfer complex". Na 2stHR, the quinone binds and the 2 electrons and one of the FAD protons are transferred for this second substrate (again, with an additional proton from the bulk), forming the product quinol.

It is now accepted that the overall mechanism occurs by a ternary complex (simultaneous binding of both substrates to the enzyme), instead of the previously proposed ping-pong mechanism.

== Phylogenetic distribution ==
The presence of NDH-2 in organisms which genome as already been fully sequenced was studied by Bioinformatics. In this study, NDH-2 were identified in 83% of Eukaryotes, 60% of bacteria and 32% of Archaeas. It was also observed the absence of NDH-2 in phyla composed of anaerobic organisms.

Despite being considered absent (hence being considered as drug targets), in this same study, the presence of a gene coding for a NDH-2 homolog was observed in the human genome.
