= Mitoquinone mesylate =

Chemical compound

Clinical data
- Trade names: MitoQ

Identifiers
- IUPAC name: 10-(4,5-dimethoxy-2-methyl-3,6-dioxocyclohexa-1,4-dien-1-yl)decyl-triphenylphosphanium methanesulfonate
- CAS Number: 845959-50-4
- PubChem CID: 11388331
- ChemSpider: 9563239
- UNII: 6E01CG547T
- ChEMBL: ChEMBL4074884
- CompTox Dashboard (EPA): DTXSID00233573

Chemical and physical data
- Formula: C_{38}H_{47}O_{7}PS
- Molar mass: 678.82 g·mol^{−1}
- 3D model (JSmol): Interactive image
- SMILES: CC1=C(C(=O)C(=C(C1=O)OC)OC)CCCCCCCCCC[P+](C2=CC=CC=C2)(C3=CC=CC=C3)C4=CC=CC=C4.CS(=O)(=O)[O-]
- InChI: InChI=1S/C37H44O4P.CH4O3S/c1-29-33(35(39)37(41-3)36(40-2)34(29)38)27-19-8-6-4-5-7-9-20-28-42(30-21-13-10-14-22-30,31-23-15-11-16-24-31)32-25-17-12-18-26-32;1-5(2,3)4/h10-18,21-26H,4-9,19-20,27-28H2,1-3H3;1H3,(H,2,3,4)/q+1;/p-1; Key:GVZFUVXPTPGOQT-UHFFFAOYSA-M

Mitoquinone mesylate (MitoQ) is a synthetic analogue of coenzyme Q10 which has antioxidant effects. It was first developed in New Zealand in the late 1990s. It has significantly improved bioavailability and improved mitochondrial penetration compared to coenzyme Q10, and has shown potential in a number of medical indications, being widely sold as a dietary supplement.

A 2014 review found insufficient evidence for the use of mitoquinone mesylate in Parkinson's disease and other movement disorders.

A 2025 British study found that diabetes patients who took daily mitoquinone, a widely available antioxidant, as well as their standard treatment had healthier hearts after four months than those not given the supplement. Mitoquinone was able to reverse the early signs of diabetes-related heart failure over the course of the study.

== See also ==
- Idebenone
- Nicotinamide mononucleotide
- Pyrroloquinoline quinone
- Vatiquinone
