= Coenzyme Q5, methyltransferase =

Enzyme found in humans

COQ5

Identifiers
- Aliases: COQ5, coenzyme Q5, methyltransferase, COQ10D9
- External IDs: OMIM: 616359; MGI: 1098643; GeneCards: COQ5
Enzyme activity
EC #	BRENDA	ExPASy	KEGG	MetaCyc
2.1.1.201	↗	↗	↗	↗

Gene location (Human)
Chr.	Chromosome 12 (human)
Band	12q24.31	Start	120,503,279 bp
Band	12q24.31	End	120,534,434 bp

Gene location (Mouse)
Chr.	Chromosome 5 (mouse)
Band	5 F|5 56.03 cM	Start	115,417,725 bp
Band	5 F|5 56.03 cM	End	115,435,031 bp
RNA expression pattern
Bgee	Human / Mouse (ortholog); Top expressed in: muscle of thigh; gastrocnemius muscle; skeletal muscle tissue; apex of heart; right lobe of liver; mucosa of transverse colon; left ventricle; right adrenal cortex; islet of Langerhans; gonad / Top expressed in: muscle of thigh; Paneth cell; digastric muscle; sternocleidomastoid muscle; interventricular septum; motor neuron; genital tubercle; quadriceps femoris muscle; vastus lateralis muscle; temporal muscle; More reference expression data
BioGPS	n/a
Gene ontology
Molecular function	methyltransferase activity; transferase activity; protein binding; 2-octaprenyl-6-methoxy-1,4-benzoquinone methylase activity; 2-decaprenyl-6-methoxy-1,4-benzoquinone methyltransferase activity
Cellular component	membrane; mitochondrion; mitochondrial inner membrane; mitochondrial matrix; protein-containing complex; extrinsic component of mitochondrial inner membrane
Biological process	ubiquinone biosynthetic process; methylation
Sources:Amigo / QuickGO
Orthologs
Databases	NCBI: entry; OMA: entry
Species	Human	Mouse
Entrez	84274	52064
Ensembl	ENSG00000110871	ENSMUSG00000041733
UniProt	Q5HYK3	Q9CXI0
RefSeq (mRNA)	NM_032314	NM_026504
RefSeq (protein)	NP_115690	NP_080780
Location (UCSC)	Chr 12: 120.5 – 120.53 Mb	Chr 5: 115.42 – 115.44 Mb
PubMed search
- Wikidata
View/Edit Human	View/Edit Mouse

2-Methoxy-6-polyprenyl-1,4-benzoquinol methylase

Identifiers
- EC no.: 2.1.1.201

Databases
- BRENDA: enzyme data
- ExPASy: NiceZyme view
- KEGG: enzyme entry
- MetaCyc: metabolic pathway
- Rhea: reactions
- PDB structures: RCSB PDB PDBe PDBsum
- Gene Ontology: AmiGO / QuickGO
Search
- PMC: articles
- PubMed: articles
- NCBI: proteins

Coenzyme Q5, methyltransferase, more commonly known as COQ5, is an enzyme involved in the electron transport chain. COQ5 is located within the mitochondrial matrix and is a part of the biosynthesis of ubiquinone.

== Function ==
COQ5 has the role of catalyst in the C-methylation in the coenzyme Q biosynthesis, on the benzoic ring of CoQ6, the biosynthetic intermediate, in both in humans and yeast Saccharomyces cerevisiae. COQ5 is one of the eleven polypeptides in yeast, that are essential for Q production. Moreover, it assembles with the CoQ-synthome, a multi-subunit complex. In humans, primary Q deficiency happens due to many COQ genes mutating. And diseases such as mitochondrial, cardiovascular, kidney and neurodegenerative diseases, are results of the decrease in Q biosynthesis. Development of soluble COQ5 proteins can be applied to other mitochondrial proteins. Coenzyme Q10 Deficiency is associated with COQ5. Therefore, to maintain CoQ10 levels in human cells, COQ5 is required.

== Catalytic activity ==
Catalyzes C-methylation and ubiquinone biosynthetic process.

== Mechanism ==
COQ5 is an S-adenosyl methionine (SAM)-dependent methyltransferase (SAM-MTase) catalyzing the C-methylation step, converting 2-methoxy-6-polyprenyl-1,4-benzoquinone (DDMQH_{2}) to 2-methoxy-5-methyl-6-polyprenyl-1,4-benzoquinone (DMQH_{2}) in the CoQ6 biosynthesis pathway.

In the catalytic mechanism of COQ5, based on the structural analyses, as the first step, before methyl transfer, Arg201 abstracts a hydrogen from the water molecule, forming a negatively charged oxygen atom which deprotonates the C5 atom of DDMQH2. Looking at the DDMQH2 substrate and Asn202, the hydroxyl group on the C4 atom and the side chain forms a hydrogen bond which leads to the formation of the O4′ anion. The stability of the C5 anion is a result of the negative charge being delocalized on the π bond conjugation system. Tyr78 acts as a catalytic base and Tyr78, Arg201 and Asn202 are invariant in COQ5 homologues.
