= 2-Polyprenyl-6-hydroxyphenol methylase =

Class of enzymes

2-polyprenyl-6-hydroxyphenol methylase

Identifiers
- EC no.: 2.1.1.222

Databases
- IntEnz: IntEnz view
- BRENDA: BRENDA entry
- ExPASy: NiceZyme view
- KEGG: KEGG entry
- MetaCyc: metabolic pathway
- PRIAM: profile
- PDB structures: RCSB PDB PDBe PDBsum
Search
- PMC: articles
- PubMed: articles
- NCBI: proteins

2-polyprenyl-6-hydroxyphenol methylase (EC 2.1.1.222, ubiG (gene), ubiG methyltransferase, 2-octaprenyl-6-hydroxyphenol methylase) is an enzyme with systematic name S-adenosyl-L-methionine:3-(all-trans-polyprenyl)benzene-1,2-diol 2-O-methyltransferase. This enzyme catalyses the following chemical reaction

S-adenosyl-L-methionine + 3-(all-trans-polyprenyl)benzene-1,2-diol $\rightleftharpoons$ S-adenosyl-L-homocysteine + 2-methoxy-6-(all-trans-polyprenyl)phenol

UbiG catalyses both methylation steps in ubiquinone biosynthesis in Escherichia coli.
