= CU-13001 =

Clinical data
- Other names: CU13001
- Routes of administration: Oral
- Drug class: ALOX15 inhibitor
- ATC code: None

CU-13001 is a 15-lipoxygenase (15-LOX, ALOX15) inhibitor which is under development for the treatment of Parkinson's disease. It is taken orally. It is thought that 4-hydroxynonenal (4-HNE), a product of 15-LOX, may be involved in the etiology of Parkinson's disease, and that by inhibiting 4-HNE formation, CU-13001 theoretically may be able to prevent or slow the progression of Parkinson's disease. The drug is under development by Acurex Biosciences. As of September 2024, it is in the preclinical research stage of development for Parkinson's disease. The chemical structure of CU-13001 does not yet appear to have been disclosed.

== See also ==
- List of investigational Parkinson's disease drugs
- Utreloxastat (EPI-857; PTC-857)
- Vatiquinone (EPI-743; PTC-743)
