= Utreloxastat =

Chemical compound

Clinical data
- Other names: EPI-857; EPI857; PTC-857; PTC857
- Routes of administration: Oral
- Drug class: ALOX15 inhibitor

Pharmacokinetic data
- Elimination half-life: 20–>33 hours

Identifiers
- IUPAC name: 2,3,5-trimethyl-6-nonylcyclohexa-2,5-diene-1,4-dione
- CAS Number: 1213269-96-5
- PubChem CID: 46174641
- IUPHAR/BPS: 13260
- DrugBank: DB18154
- ChemSpider: 115006754
- UNII: WW8KZK2PZT
- KEGG: D12510
- ChEMBL: ChEMBL5314565

Chemical and physical data
- Formula: C_{18}H_{28}O_{2}
- Molar mass: 276.420 g·mol^{−1}
- 3D model (JSmol): Interactive image
- SMILES: CCCCCCCCCC1=C(C(=O)C(=C(C1=O)C)C)C
- InChI: InChI=1S/C18H28O2/c1-5-6-7-8-9-10-11-12-16-15(4)17(19)13(2)14(3)18(16)20/h5-12H2,1-4H3; Key:IJWAQTHZBDBIID-UHFFFAOYSA-N

Utreloxastat (INN, USAN, JAN; developmental code names EPI-857 and PTC-857) is a 15-lipoxygenase (15-LOX; ALOX15) inhibitor which is under development for the treatment of amyotrophic lateral sclerosis (ALS). It was also previously under development for the treatment of Parkinson's disease, but development for this indication was discontinued. The drug is taken orally.

It acts as a selective inhibitor of 15-LOX, an enzyme involved in inflammation, oxidative stress, and ferroptosis. By inhibiting 15-LOX, utreloxastat may replenish intracellular glutathione levels and reduce such processes. The elimination half-life of utreloxastat is 20 to 25 hours with a single doses and increases to greater than 33 hours with repeated administration.

Utreloxastat is or has been under development by BioElectron Technology and PTC Therapeutics. As of April 2025, it is in phase 2 clinical trials for treatment of amyotrophic lateral sclerosis (ALS). It was also under development for the treatment of Parkinson's disease, and reached phase 1 trials for this indication, but development for this use was discontinued. A phase 2 trial of utreloxastat for ALS was terminated early due to failing to meet its primary endpoint of slowing disease progression and due to company decision in March 2025 and there have been no further developmental updates since.

== See also ==
- List of investigational Parkinson's disease drugs
- Vatiquinone (EPI-743; PTC-743)
- CU-13001
