= ETFDH =

Protein-coding gene in humans

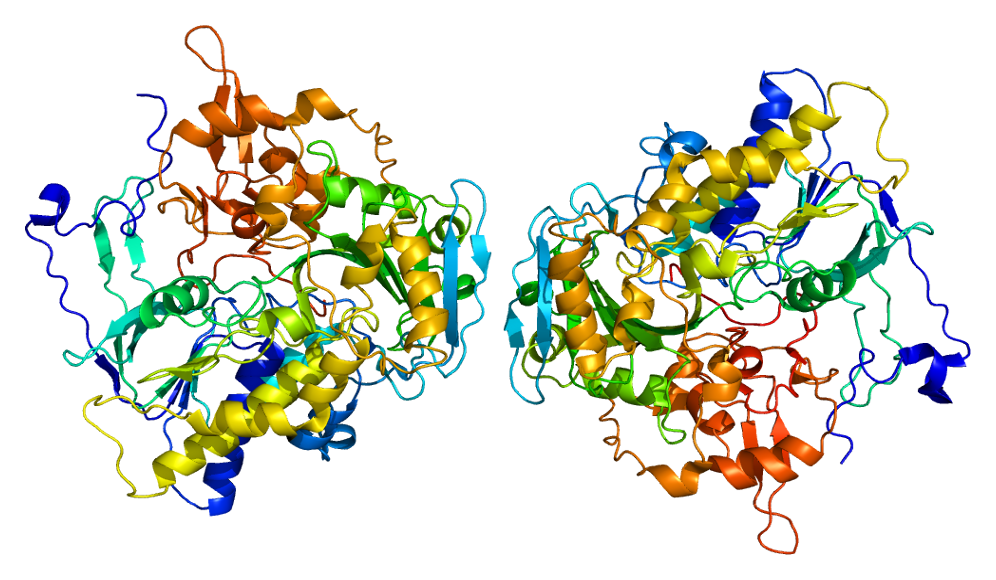

Identifiers
- Aliases: ETFDH, electron-transferring-flavoprotein dehydrogenase, ETFQO, MADD, electron transfer flavoprotein dehydrogenase
- External IDs: OMIM: 231675; MGI: 106100; HomoloGene: 3275; GeneCards: ETFDH; OMA:ETFDH - orthologs

Gene location (Human)
Chr.	Chromosome 4 (human)
Band	4q32.1	Start	158,671,968 bp
Band	4q32.1	End	158,710,742 bp

Gene location (Mouse)
Chr.	Chromosome 3 (mouse)
Band	3 E3|3 34.91 cM	Start	79,511,095 bp
Band	3 E3|3 34.91 cM	End	79,536,807 bp
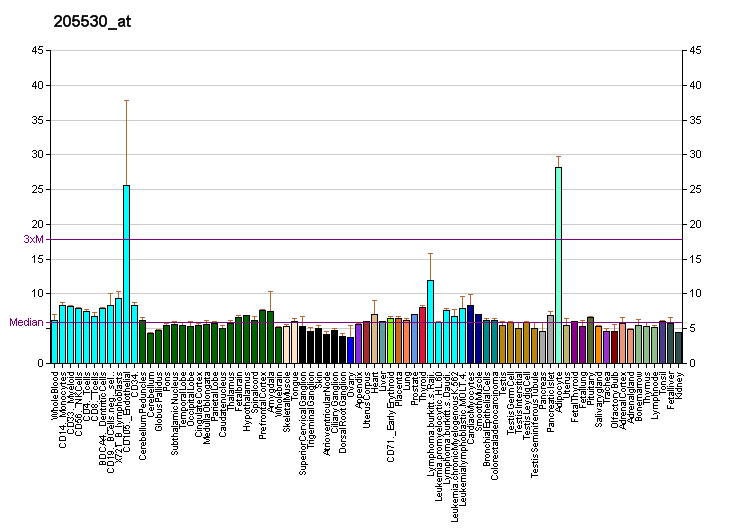

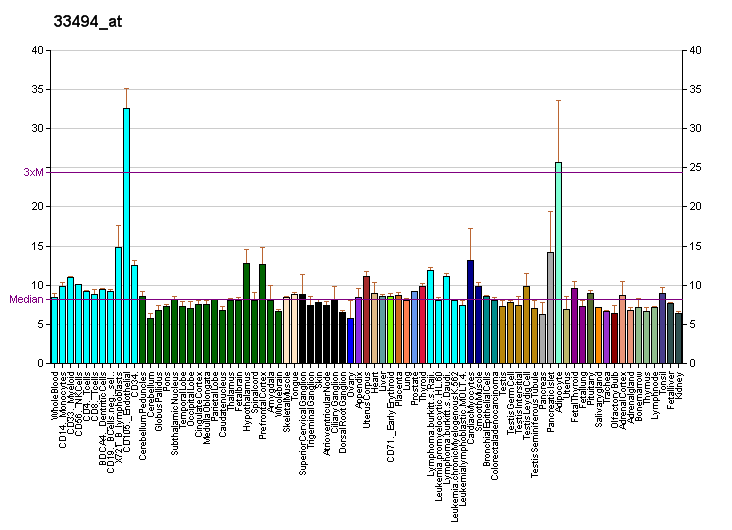
RNA expression pattern
Bgee	Human / Mouse (ortholog); Top expressed in: apex of heart; left ventricle; muscle of thigh; right lobe of liver; jejunal mucosa; right auricle of heart; right ventricle; gastrocnemius muscle; right adrenal gland; right adrenal cortex / Top expressed in: right ventricle; myocardium of ventricle; cardiac muscles; interventricular septum; cardiac muscle tissue of left ventricle; intercostal muscle; digastric muscle; soleus muscle; thoracic diaphragm; brown adipose tissue; More reference expression data
BioGPS	More reference expression data
Gene ontology
Molecular function	4 iron, 4 sulfur cluster binding; ubiquinone binding; quinone binding; flavin adenine dinucleotide binding; iron-sulfur cluster binding; metal ion binding; electron transfer activity; oxidoreductase activity; electron-transferring-flavoprotein dehydrogenase activity; oxidoreductase activity, acting on metal ions, flavin as acceptor
Cellular component	membrane; integral component of mitochondrial inner membrane; mitochondrial matrix; mitochondrion; mitochondrial inner membrane; mitochondrial membranes; mitochondrial electron transfer flavoprotein complex
Biological process	fatty acid beta-oxidation using acyl-CoA dehydrogenase; response to oxidative stress; electron transport chain; respiratory electron transport chain
Sources:Amigo / QuickGO
Orthologs
Species	Human	Mouse
Entrez	2110	66841
Ensembl	ENSG00000171503	ENSMUSG00000027809
UniProt	Q16134	Q921G7
RefSeq (mRNA)	NM_004453; NM_001281737; NM_001281738	NM_025794
RefSeq (protein)	NP_001268666; NP_001268667; NP_004444	NP_080070
Location (UCSC)	Chr 4: 158.67 – 158.71 Mb	Chr 3: 79.51 – 79.54 Mb
PubMed search
- Wikidata
View/Edit Human	View/Edit Mouse

Electron transfer flavoprotein-ubiquinone oxidoreductase, mitochondrial is an enzyme that in humans is encoded by the ETFDH gene. This gene encodes a component of the electron-transfer system in mitochondria and is essential for electron transfer from a number of mitochondrial flavin-containing dehydrogenases to the main respiratory chain.

== Function ==
Electron-transferring-flavoprotein dehydrogenase in the inner mitochondrial membrane accepts electrons from electron-transfer flavoprotein which is located in the mitochondrial matrix and reduces ubiquinone in the mitochondrial membrane. Deficiency in electron-transferring-flavoprotein dehydrogenase have been demonstrated in some patients with type II glutaric aciduria.

== Structure ==
The ETFDH gene is located on the q arm of chromosome 4 in position 32.1 and has 13 exons spanning 36,613 base pairs. The protein is synthesized as a 67-kDa precursor which is targeted to mitochondria and processed in a single step to a 64-kDa mature form located in the mitochondrial membrane. This 64-kDA mature form is a monomer integrated into the mitochondrial inner membrane, containing a 4Fe-4S cluster and 1 molecule of FAD.

== Function ==
This enzyme, along with electron transfer flavoprotein (ETF), is required for electron transfer from more than 9 mitochondrial flavin-containing dehydrogenases to the main respiratory chains. It accepts electrons from ETF and reduces ubiquinone.

== Clinical Significance ==
Mutations in the ETFDH can cause glutaric aciduria 2C (GA2C), an autosomal recessively inherited disorder of fatty acid, amino acid, and choline metabolism. It is characterized by multiple acyl-CoA dehydrogenase deficiencies resulting in large excretion not only of glutaric acid, but also of lactic, ethylmalonic, butyric, isobutyric, 2-methyl-butyric, and isovaleric acids.

A c.250G>A (p.Ala84Thr) mutation, the most common mutation in the ETFDH gene, causes increased production of reactive oxygen species (ROS) and shortened neurites in cells expressing this mutant compared to wild type cells. Suberic acid, an accumulated intermediate metabolite in dehydrogenase deficiency, can significantly impair neurite outgrowth in NSC34 cells. This shortening of neurites can be restored by riboflavin, carnitine, or Coenzyme Q10 supplements.

== Interactions ==
The encoded protein interacts with MYH7B, LINC00174, LINC00574, Homeobox protein goosecoid-2, AIRE, OTX1, Keratin-associated protein 13-2, Keratin-associated protein 11-1, TRIM69, Zinc finger protein 581, and COX6B1.
