= Coenzyme Q5 =

Names
- IUPAC name 2,3-Dimethoxy-5-methyl-6-[(2E,6E,10E,14E)-3,7,11,15,19-pentamethylicosa-2,6,10,14,18-pentaenyl]cyclohexa-2,5-diene-1,4-dione
- Other names: Ubiquinone-5; Ubiquinone Q5; CoQ5; 2,3-Dimethoxy-5-methyl-6-pentaprenyl-1,4-benzoquinone

Identifiers
CAS Number	4370-61-0
3D model (JSmol)	Interactive image
Beilstein Reference	2315703
ChEBI	CHEBI:46331
ChemSpider	20147958
PubChem CID	12832984
- InChI: InChI=1S/C34H50O4/c1-24(2)14-10-15-25(3)16-11-17-26(4)18-12-19-27(5)20-13-21-28(6)22-23-30-29(7)31(35)33(37-8)34(38-9)32(30)36/h14,16,18,20,22H,10-13,15,17,19,21,23H2,1-9H3/b25-16+,26-18+,27-20+,28-22+ Key: NYFAQDMDAFCWPU-UVCHAVPFSA-N
- SMILES: CC1=C(C(=O)C(=C(C1=O)OC)OC)C/C=C(\C)/CC/C=C(\C)/CC/C=C(\C)/CC/C=C(\C)/CCC=C(C)C

Properties
Chemical formula	C_{34}H_{42}O_{4}
Molar mass	514.706 g·mol^{−1}
- Except where otherwise noted, data are given for materials in their standard state (at 25 °C [77 °F], 100 kPa). Infobox references

Coenzyme Q5, more commonly known as COQ5, is a coenzyme involved in the electron transport chain. It is a shorter-chain homolog of coenzyme Q10 (ubiquinone), the more-common coenzyme of this family.
