= Caldalkalibacillus uzonensis =

Scientific classification
- Domain: Bacteria
- Kingdom: Bacillati
- Phylum: Bacillota
- Class: Bacilli
- Order: Bacillales
- Family: Bacillaceae
- Genus: Caldalkalibacillus
- Species: C. uzonensis

Binomial name
- Caldalkalibacillus uzonensis Zhao et al. 2008

Type strain
- ATCC BAA-1258, DSM 17740, JW/WZ-YB58

Synonyms
- Thermalkalibacillus uzonensis

Species of bacterium

Caldalkalibacillus uzonensis is a thermophilic, alkalitolerant, aerobic, heterotrophic spore-forming bacterium from the genus of Caldalkalibacillus which has been isolated from the hot spring Zarvarzin II from the East Thermal Field in Uzon Caldera in Russia.
