= COQ2 =

Protein-coding gene in humans

Identifiers
- Aliases: COQ2, CL640, COQ10D1, MSA1, PHB:PPT, coenzyme Q2, polyprenyltransferase
- External IDs: OMIM: 609825; MGI: 1919133; HomoloGene: 69192; GeneCards: COQ2; OMA:COQ2 - orthologs

Gene location (Human)
| Chr. | Chromosome 4 (human) |
| Band | 4q21.23 | Start | 83,261,536 bp |
| Band | 4q21.23 | End | 83,284,914 bp |

Gene location (Mouse)
| Chr. | Chromosome 5 (mouse) |
| Band | 5|5 E4 | Start | 100,802,589 bp |
| Band | 5|5 E4 | End | 100,823,006 bp |
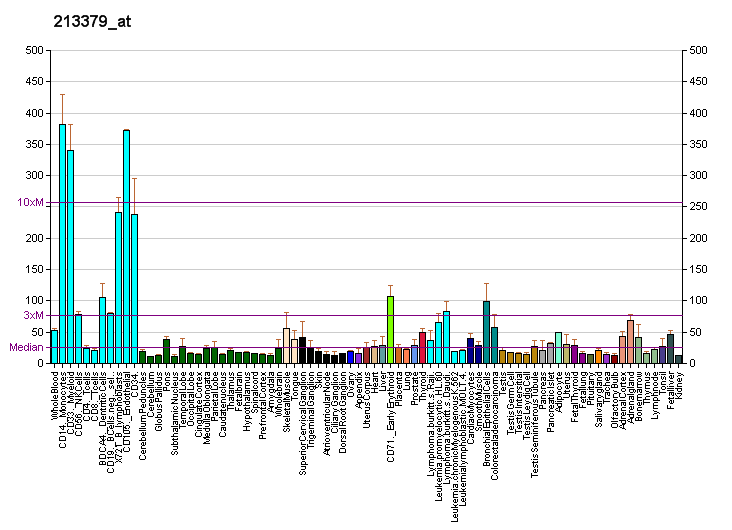
RNA expression pattern
| Bgee | Human / Mouse (ortholog); Top expressed in: Skeletal muscle tissue of biceps brachii; Skeletal muscle tissue of rectus abdominis; gingival epithelium; vastus lateralis muscle; monocyte; body of tongue; triceps brachii muscle; muscle of thigh; glutes; deltoid muscle / Top expressed in: left ventricle; interventricular septum; proximal tubule; quadriceps femoris muscle; right kidney; muscle of thigh; upper arm; neural layer of retina; muscle tissue; visual cortex; More reference expression data |
| BioGPS | More reference expression data |
Gene ontology
| Molecular function | transferase activity; 4-hydroxybenzoate nonaprenyltransferase activity; prenyltransferase activity; 4-hydroxybenzoate decaprenyltransferase activity; transferase activity, transferring alkyl or aryl (other than methyl) groups |
| Cellular component | integral component of membrane; mitochondrial inner membrane; membrane; mitochondrion; integral component of mitochondrial inner membrane |
| Biological process | glycerol metabolic process; isoprenoid biosynthetic process; ubiquinone biosynthetic process |
Sources:Amigo / QuickGO
Orthologs
| Species | Human | Mouse |
| Entrez | 27235 | 71883 |
| Ensembl | ENSG00000173085 | ENSMUSG00000029319 |
| UniProt | Q96H96 | Q66JT7 |
| RefSeq (mRNA) | NM_015697; NM_001358921 | NM_027978 |
| RefSeq (protein) | NP_056512; NP_001345850 | NP_082254 |
| Location (UCSC) | Chr 4: 83.26 – 83.28 Mb | Chr 5: 100.8 – 100.82 Mb |
| PubMed search |
- Wikidata
| View/Edit Human | View/Edit Mouse |

Para-hydroxybenzoate—polyprenyltransferase, mitochondrial is an enzyme that in humans is encoded by the COQ2 gene.

CoQ (ubiquinone) serves as a redox carrier in the mitochondrial respiratory chain and is a lipid-soluble antioxidant. COQ2, or parahydroxybenzoate-polyprenyltransferase (EC 2.5.1.39), catalyzes one of the final reactions in the biosynthesis of CoQ, the prenylation of parahydroxybenzoate with an all-trans polyprenyl group (Forsgren et al., 2004).[supplied by OMIM]

== Role in pathology ==
Homozygous or compound heterozygous mutations of the COQ2 gene cause primary coenzyme Q10 deficiency 1, a mitochondrial disease.
