= COQ6 =

Protein-coding gene in humans

Identifiers
- Aliases: COQ6, CGI10, COQ10D6, CGI-10, coenzyme Q6, monooxygenase
- External IDs: OMIM: 614647; MGI: 1924408; HomoloGene: 6039; GeneCards: COQ6; OMA:COQ6 - orthologs

Gene location (Human)
Chr.	Chromosome 14 (human)
Band	14q24.3	Start	73,949,926 bp
Band	14q24.3	End	73,963,670 bp

Gene location (Mouse)
Chr.	Chromosome 12 (mouse)
Band	12|12 D1	Start	84,408,431 bp
Band	12|12 D1	End	84,420,570 bp
RNA expression pattern
Bgee	Human / Mouse (ortholog); Top expressed in: right adrenal cortex; left adrenal gland; left adrenal cortex; apex of heart; muscle of thigh; gastrocnemius muscle; gonad; right auricle; left ventricle; left testis / Top expressed in: interventricular septum; brown adipose tissue; myocardium of ventricle; lip; spermatid; muscle of thigh; proximal tubule; yolk sac; right kidney; morula; More reference expression data
BioGPS	n/a
Gene ontology
Molecular function	oxidoreductase activity; oxidoreductase activity, acting on paired donors, with incorporation or reduction of molecular oxygen, NAD(P)H as one donor, and incorporation of one atom of oxygen; FAD binding; flavin adenine dinucleotide binding; monooxygenase activity; oxidoreductase activity, acting on paired donors, with incorporation or reduction of molecular oxygen, reduced flavin or flavoprotein as one donor, and incorporation of one atom of oxygen; protein binding
Cellular component	mitochondrial inner membrane; Golgi apparatus; cell projection; membrane; mitochondrion; extrinsic component of mitochondrial inner membrane
Biological process	ubiquinone biosynthetic process
Sources:Amigo / QuickGO
Orthologs
Species	Human	Mouse
Entrez	51004	217707
Ensembl	ENSG00000119723	ENSMUSG00000021235
UniProt	Q9Y2Z9	Q8R1S0
RefSeq (mRNA)	NM_182476; NM_182480	NM_172582
RefSeq (protein)	NP_872282; NP_872286	NP_766170
Location (UCSC)	Chr 14: 73.95 – 73.96 Mb	Chr 12: 84.41 – 84.42 Mb
PubMed search
- Wikidata
View/Edit Human	View/Edit Mouse

Coenzyme Q6 monooxygenase is a protein that in humans is encoded by the COQ6 gene.

== Function ==
The protein encoded by this gene belongs to the ubiH/COQ6 family. It is an evolutionarily conserved monooxygenase required for the biosynthesis of coenzyme Q10 (or ubiquinone), which is an essential component of the mitochondrial electron transport chain, and one of the most potent lipophilic antioxidants implicated in the protection of cell damage by reactive oxygen species. knockdown of this gene in mouse and zebrafish results in decreased growth due to increased apoptosis.

== Clinical significance ==
Mutations in this gene are associated with autosomal recessive coenzyme Q10 deficiency-6 (COQ10D6), which manifests as nephrotic syndrome with sensorineural deafness. Alternatively spliced transcript variants encoding different isoforms have been described for this gene.
