= COQ8A =

Protein-coding gene in humans

Identifiers
- Aliases: COQ8A, ARCA2, CABC1, COQ10D4, COQ8, SCAR9, ADCK3, aarF domain containing kinase 3, coenzyme Q8A
- External IDs: OMIM: 606980; MGI: 1914676; GeneCards: COQ8A
Available structures
PDB	Ortholog search: PDBe RCSB
PDB	List of PDB id codes 4PED

Gene location (Human)
Chr.	Chromosome 1 (human)
Band	1q42.13	Start	226,940,286 bp
Band	1q42.13	End	226,987,544 bp

Gene location (Mouse)
Chr.	Chromosome 1 (mouse)
Band	1|1 H4	Start	179,992,803 bp
Band	1|1 H4	End	180,027,167 bp
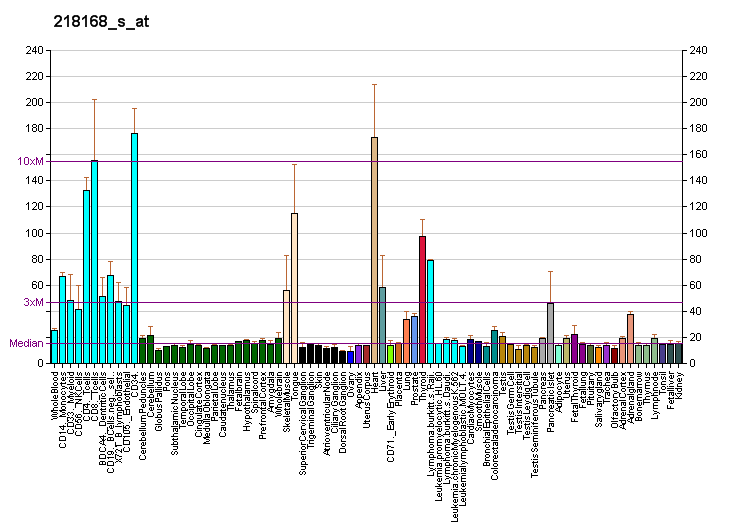
RNA expression pattern
Bgee	Human / Mouse (ortholog); Top expressed in: gastrocnemius muscle; skeletal muscle tissue; muscle of thigh; apex of heart; body of pancreas; left ventricle; right adrenal gland; right adrenal cortex; left adrenal gland; left adrenal cortex / Top expressed in: extraocular muscle; interventricular septum; soleus muscle; digastric muscle; muscle of thigh; sternocleidomastoid muscle; tibialis anterior muscle; temporal muscle; masseter muscle; myocardium of ventricle; More reference expression data
BioGPS	More reference expression data
Gene ontology
Molecular function	transferase activity; nucleotide binding; ADP binding; protein binding; ATP binding; protein kinase activity; kinase activity
Cellular component	integral component of membrane; mitochondrion; membrane; extrinsic component of mitochondrial inner membrane
Biological process	ubiquinone biosynthetic process; protein phosphorylation; phosphorylation
Sources:Amigo / QuickGO
Orthologs
Databases	NCBI: entry; OMA: entry
Species	Human	Mouse
Entrez	56997	67426
Ensembl	ENSG00000163050	ENSMUSG00000026489
UniProt	Q8NI60	Q60936
RefSeq (mRNA)	NM_020247	NM_001163290; NM_023341; NM_001359268; NM_001359269
RefSeq (protein)	NP_064632	NP_001156762; NP_075830; NP_001346197; NP_001346198
Location (UCSC)	Chr 1: 226.94 – 226.99 Mb	Chr 1: 179.99 – 180.03 Mb
PubMed search
- Wikidata
View/Edit Human	View/Edit Mouse

Atypical kinase COQ8A, mitochondrial is a protein that in humans is encoded by the COQ8A gene (previously ADCK3). COQ8A is an atypical kinase that is involved in the production of Coenzyme Q, which is an important coenzyme used in aerobic cellular respiration.

This gene encodes a mitochondrial protein similar to yeast ABC1, which functions in an electron-transferring membrane protein complex in the respiratory chain. It is not related to the family of ABC transporter proteins. Expression of this gene is induced by the tumor suppressor p53 and in response to DNA damage, and inhibiting its expression partially suppresses p53-induced apoptosis. Alternatively spliced transcript variants have been found; however, their full-length nature has not been determined.
