= Bacillus horti =

Scientific classification
- Domain: Bacteria
- Kingdom: Bacillati
- Phylum: Bacillota
- Class: Bacilli
- Order: Bacillales
- Family: Bacillaceae
- Genus: Bacillus
- Species: B. horti

Binomial name
- Bacillus horti Yumoto et al. 1998

Species of bacterium

Bacillus horti is a species of Gram-negative alkaliphilic bacillus. Its cells are strictly aerobic rods that produce subterminally located ellipsoidal spores. Its type strain is K13^{T} (= JCM 9943^{T}).
