= Caldalkalibacillus thermarum =

Scientific classification
- Domain: Bacteria
- Kingdom: Bacillati
- Phylum: Bacillota
- Class: Bacilli
- Order: Bacillales
- Family: Bacillaceae
- Genus: Caldalkalibacillus
- Species: C. thermarum

Binomial name
- Caldalkalibacillus thermarum Xue et al. 2006

Type strain
- HA6, CGMCC 1.4242, JCM 13486

Species of bacterium

Caldalkalibacillus thermarum is a Gram-positive, thermophilic and alkaliphilic bacterium from the genus of Caldalkalibacillus which has been isolated from a hot spring from Tengchong in China.
