= Adenine deaminase =

Class of enzymes

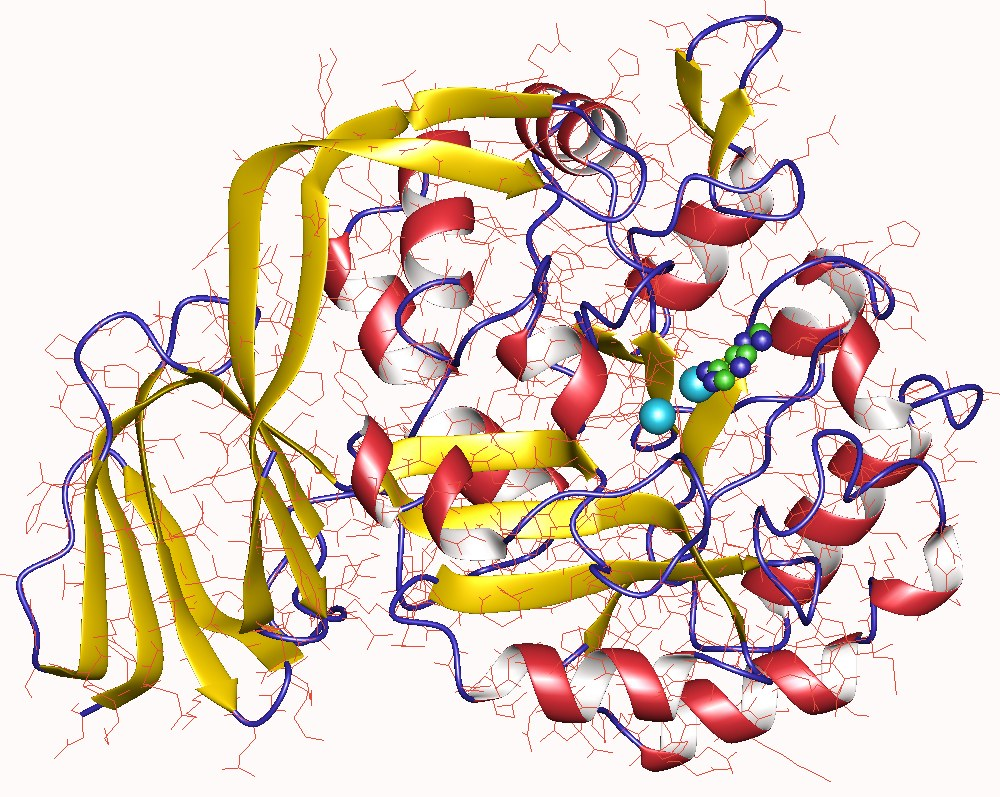
- adenine deaminase monomer, Enterococcus

Identifiers
- EC no.: 3.5.4.2
- CAS no.: 9027-68-3

Databases
- BRENDA: enzyme data
- ExPASy: NiceZyme view
- KEGG: enzyme entry
- MetaCyc: metabolic pathway
- Rhea: reactions
- PDB structures: RCSB PDB PDBe PDBsum
- Gene Ontology: AmiGO / QuickGO
Search
- PMC: articles
- PubMed: articles
- NCBI: proteins

Adenine deaminase (EC 3.5.4.2) is an enzyme characterised from Azotobacter vinelandii (and also found in archaea and fungi) that catalyzes the hydrolysis of the nucleotide base, adenine, to hypoxanthine and ammonia:

adenine
H_{2}O
NH_{3}
hypoxanthine

Variants of this enzyme can act on adenine incorporated in RNA. It has also been modified to behave as a cytidine deaminase for use in CRISPR gene editing.

This enzyme is a hydrolase, one acting on carbon-nitrogen bonds other than peptide bonds, specifically in cyclic amidines. The systematic name of this enzyme class is adenine aminohydrolase. Other names in common use include adenase, adenine aminase, and ADase.

== Structural studies ==
As of late 2007, only one structure has been solved for this class of enzymes, with the PDB accession code PDB: 2ICS.
