= PDSS1 =

Protein-coding gene in the species Homo sapiens

Identifiers
- Aliases: PDSS1, COQ1, COQ10D2, DPS, SPS, TPRT, TPT, TPT 1, hDPS1, prenyl (decaprenyl) diphosphate synthase, subunit 1, decaprenyl diphosphate synthase subunit 1, COQ1A
- External IDs: OMIM: 607429; MGI: 1889278; HomoloGene: 5353; GeneCards: PDSS1; OMA:PDSS1 - orthologs

Gene location (Human)
Chr.	Chromosome 10 (human)
Band	10p12.1	Start	26,697,701 bp
Band	10p12.1	End	26,746,798 bp

Gene location (Mouse)
Chr.	Chromosome 2 (mouse)
Band	2|2 A3	Start	22,785,534 bp
Band	2|2 A3	End	22,830,278 bp
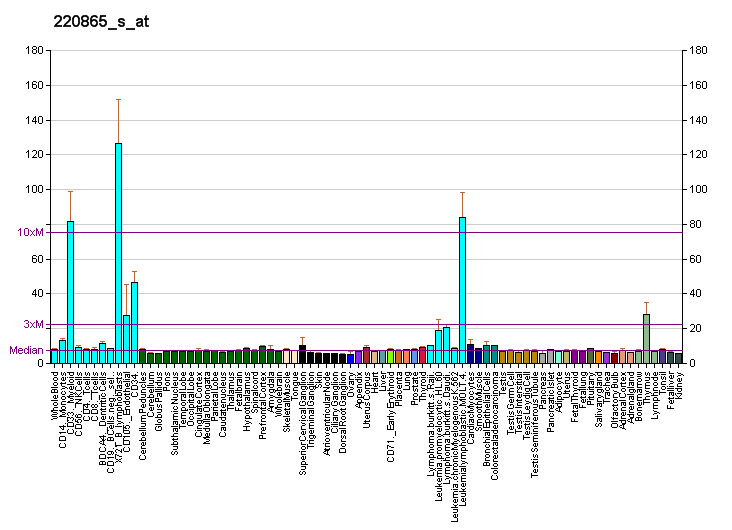
RNA expression pattern
Bgee	Human / Mouse (ortholog); Top expressed in: mucosa of transverse colon; rectum; jejunal mucosa; duodenum; monocyte; testicle; cerebellar hemisphere; gonad; mucosa of ileum; right hemisphere of cerebellum / Top expressed in: Paneth cell; proximal tubule; right kidney; otic placode; otic vesicle; saccule; soleus muscle; duodenum; jejunum; embryo; More reference expression data
BioGPS	More reference expression data
Gene ontology
Molecular function	metal ion binding; protein heterodimerization activity; trans-hexaprenyltranstransferase activity; transferase activity
Cellular component	mitochondrial matrix; mitochondrion; transferase complex
Biological process	isoprenoid biosynthetic process; protein heterotetramerization; ubiquinone biosynthetic process
Sources:Amigo / QuickGO
Orthologs
Species	Human	Mouse
Entrez	23590	56075
Ensembl	ENSG00000148459	ENSMUSG00000026784
UniProt	Q5T2R2	Q33DR2
RefSeq (mRNA)	NM_014317; NM_001321978; NM_001321979	NM_019501; NM_001355467
RefSeq (protein)	NP_001308907; NP_001308908; NP_055132	NP_062374; NP_001342396
Location (UCSC)	Chr 10: 26.7 – 26.75 Mb	Chr 2: 22.79 – 22.83 Mb
PubMed search
- Wikidata
View/Edit Human	View/Edit Mouse

Decaprenyl-diphosphate synthase subunit 1 is an enzyme that in humans is encoded by the PDSS1 gene.

The protein encoded by this gene is an enzyme that elongates the prenyl side-chain of coenzyme Q, or ubiquinone, one of the key elements in the respiratory chain. The gene product catalyzes the formation of all trans-polyprenyl pyrophosphates from isopentyl diphosphate during the assembly of polyisoprenoid side chains, the first step in coenzyme Q biosynthesis. The protein may be peripherally associated with the inner mitochondrial membrane, though no transit peptide has been definitively identified to date.
