= Electron-transferring flavoprotein =

Electron transfer flavoprotein domain
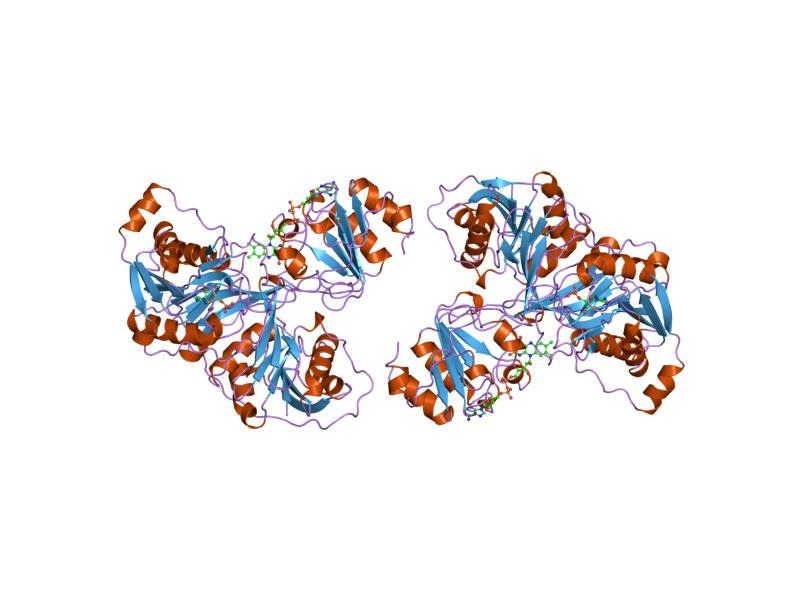
- electron transfer flavoprotein (etf) from paracoccus denitrificans

Identifiers
- Symbol: ETF
- Pfam: PF01012
- Pfam clan: CL0039
- InterPro: IPR014730
- PROSITE: PDOC00583
- SCOP2: 1efv / SCOPe / SUPFAM
Available protein structures:
- PDB: IPR014730 PF01012 (ECOD; PDBsum)
- AlphaFold: IPR014730; PF01012

Electron transfer flavoprotein FAD-binding domain
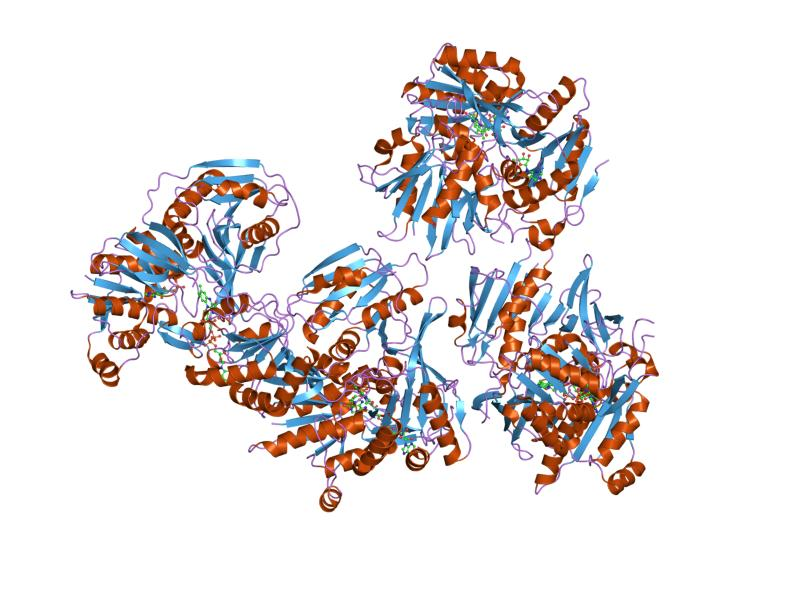
- structure of electron transferring flavoprotein for methylophilus methylotrophus.

Identifiers
- Symbol: ETF_alpha
- Pfam: PF00766
- Pfam clan: CL0085
- InterPro: IPR014731
- PROSITE: PDOC00583
- SCOP2: 1efv / SCOPe / SUPFAM
Available protein structures:
- PDB: IPR014731 PF00766 (ECOD; PDBsum)
- AlphaFold: IPR014731; PF00766

An electron transfer flavoprotein (ETF) or electron transfer flavoprotein complex (CETF) is a flavoprotein located on the matrix face of the inner mitochondrial membrane and functions as a specific electron acceptor for primary dehydrogenases, transferring the electrons to terminal respiratory systems such as electron-transferring-flavoprotein dehydrogenase. They can be functionally classified into constitutive, "housekeeping" ETFs, mainly involved in the oxidation of fatty acids (Group I), and ETFs produced by some prokaryotes under specific growth conditions, receiving electrons only from the oxidation of specific substrates (Group II).

ETFs are heterodimeric proteins composed of an alpha and beta subunit (ETFA and ETFB), and contain an FAD cofactor and AMP. ETF consists of three domains: domains I and II are formed by the N- and C-terminal portions of the alpha subunit, respectively, while domain III is formed by the beta subunit. Domains I and III share an almost identical alpha-beta-alpha sandwich fold, while domain II forms an alpha-beta-alpha sandwich similar to that of bacterial flavodoxins. FAD is bound in a cleft between domains II and III, while domain III binds the AMP molecule. Interactions between domains I and III stabilise the protein, forming a shallow bowl where domain II resides.

LYRM5, a member of the LYRM protein superfamily, deflavinates ETF by interacting with both ETFA and ETFB. This destabilizes the FAD-binding site, leading to the release of FAD and, subsequently, to the disruption of electron transfer.

Mutation in ETFs can lead to deficiency of passing reducing equivalent of FADH_{2} to electron transport chain, causing Glutaric acidemia type 2

== See also ==
- Electron transport chain
- Electron-transferring-flavoprotein dehydrogenase
- Glutaric acidemia type 2
- Metabolism
- Microbial metabolism
- Oxidative phosphorylation
