= Coenzyme Q10 =

Biochemical cofactor and antioxidant

Coenzyme Q_{10}

Names
- Preferred IUPAC name 2-[(2E,6E,10E,14E,18E,22E,26E,30E,34E)-3,7,11,15,19,23,27,31,35,39-Decamethyltetraconta-2,6,10,14,18,22,26,30,34,38-decaen-1-yl]-5,6-dimethoxy-3-methylcyclohexa-2,5-diene-1,4-dione
- Other names: In general: Ubiquinone, coenzyme Q, CoQ, vitamin Q; This form: ubidecarenone, Q_{10}, CoQ_{10} /ˌkoʊˌkjuːˈtɛn/

Identifiers
CAS Number	303-98-0
3D model (JSmol)	Interactive image
ChEBI	CHEBI:46245
ChEMBL	ChEMBL454801
ChemSpider	4445197
ECHA InfoCard	100.005.590
KEGG	C11378
PubChem CID	5281915
UNII	EJ27X76M46
CompTox Dashboard (EPA)	DTXSID6046054
- InChI: InChI=1S/C59H90O4/c1-44(2)24-15-25-45(3)26-16-27-46(4)28-17-29-47(5)30-18-31-48(6)32-19-33-49(7)34-20-35-50(8)36-21-37-51(9)38-22-39-52(10)40-23-41-53(11)42-43-55-54(12)56(60)58(62-13)59(63-14)57(55)61/h24,26,28,30,32,34,36,38,40,42H,15-23,25,27,29,31,33,35,37,39,41,43H2,1-14H3/b45-26+,46-28+,47-30+,48-32+,49-34+,50-36+,51-38+,52-40+,53-42+ Key: ACTIUHUUMQJHFO-UPTCCGCDSA-N; InChI=1/C59H90O4/c1-44(2)24-15-25-45(3)26-16-27-46(4)28-17-29-47(5)30-18-31-48(6)32-19-33-49(7)34-20-35-50(8)36-21-37-51(9)38-22-39-52(10)40-23-41-53(11)42-43-55-54(12)56(60)58(62-13)59(63-14)57(55)61/h24,26,28,30,32,34,36,38,40,42H,15-23,25,27,29,31,33,35,37,39,41,43H2,1-14H3/b45-26+,46-28+,47-30+,48-32+,49-34+,50-36+,51-38+,52-40+,53-42+ Key: ACTIUHUUMQJHFO-UPTCCGCDBK
- SMILES: O=C1/C(=C(\C(=O)C(\OC)=C1\OC)C)C\C=C(/C)CC\C=C(/C)CC\C=C(/C)CC\C=C(/C)CC\C=C(/C)CC\C=C(/C)CC\C=C(/C)CC\C=C(/C)CC\C=C(/C)CC\C=C(/C)C

Properties
Chemical formula	C_{59}H_{90}O_{4}
Molar mass	863.365 g·mol^{−1}
Appearance	yellow or orange solid
Melting point	48–52 °C (118–126 °F; 321–325 K)
Solubility in water	insoluble

Pharmacology
ATC code	C01EB09 (WHO)

Related compounds
Related quinones	1,4-Benzoquinone; Plastoquinone; Ubiquinol
- Except where otherwise noted, data are given for materials in their standard state (at 25 °C [77 °F], 100 kPa). verify (what is ?) Infobox references

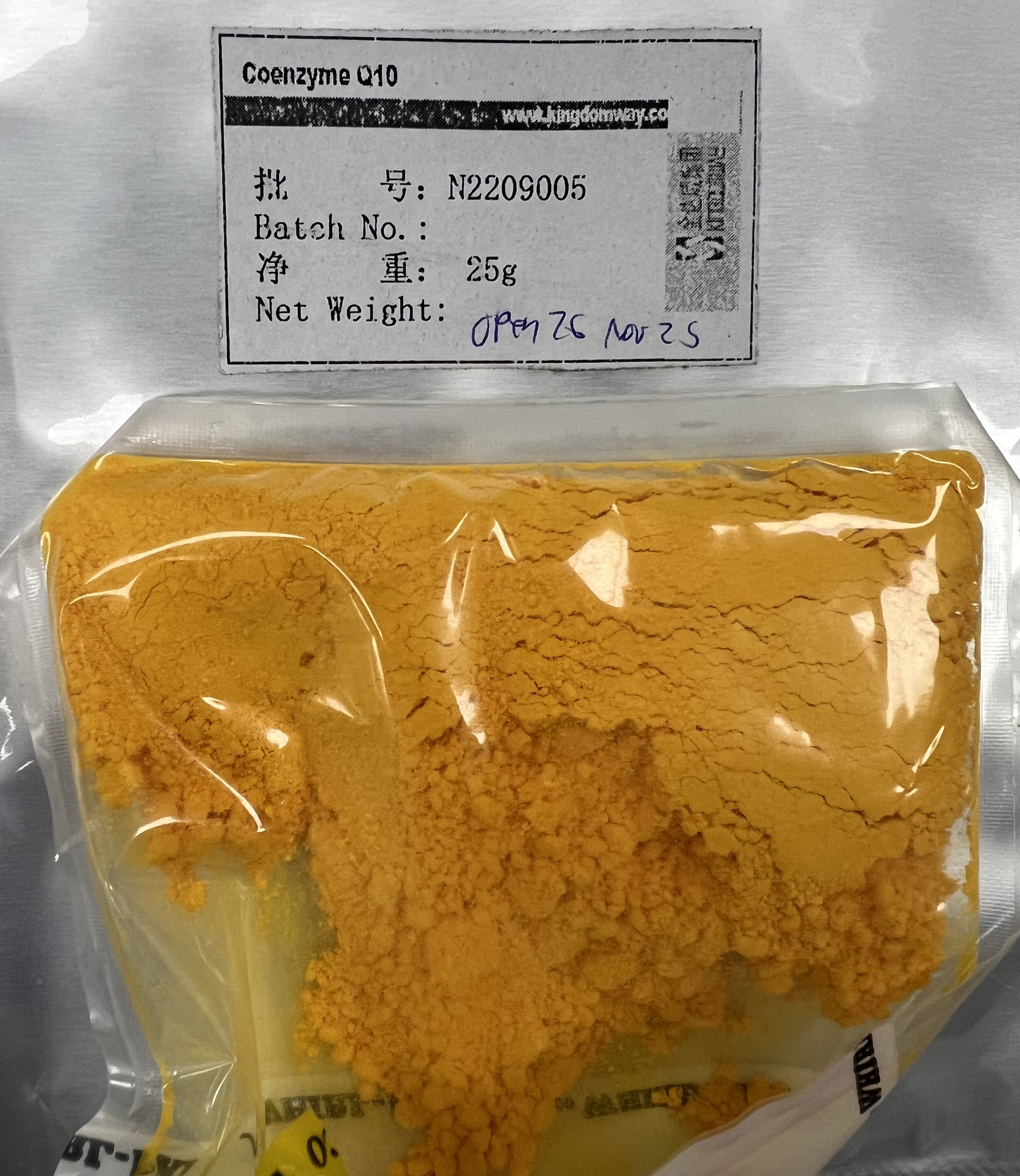
Coenzyme Q10 powder

Coenzyme Q (CoQ /ˌkoʊkjuː/), also known as ubiquinone, is a naturally occurring biochemical cofactor (coenzyme) and an antioxidant produced by the human body. The human body mainly produces the form known as coenzyme Q_{10} (CoQ_{10}, ubidecarenone), but other forms exist. CoQ is used by and found in many organisms, including animals and bacteria. As a result, it can also be obtained from dietary sources, such as meat, fish, seed oils, vegetables, and dietary supplements.

CoQ plays a role in mitochondrial oxidative phosphorylation, aiding in the production of adenosine triphosphate (ATP), which is involved in energy transfer within cells. The structure of CoQ_{10} consists of a benzoquinone moiety and an isoprenoid side chain, with the "10" referring to the number of isoprenyl chemical subunits in its tail.

Although a ubiquitous molecule in human tissues, CoQ_{10} is not a dietary nutrient and does not have a recommended intake level, and its use as a supplement is not approved in the United States for any health or anti-disease effect.

== Biological functions ==
CoQ_{10} is a component of the mitochondrial electron transport chain (ETC), where it plays a role in oxidative phosphorylation, a process required for the biosynthesis of adenosine triphosphate, the primary energy source of cells.

CoQ_{10} is a lipophilic molecule that is located in all biological membranes of the human body and is a component for the synthesis of ATP and a life-sustaining cofactor for the three complexes (complex I, complex II, and complex III) of the ETC in the mitochondria. CoQ_{10} has a role in the transport of protons and calcium across membranes.

The mitochondrial oxidative phosphorylation process occurs in the inner mitochondrial membrane of eukaryotic cells. This membrane is highly folded into structures called cristae, which increase the surface area available for oxidative phosphorylation. CoQ_{10} plays a role in this process as an essential cofactor of the ETC located in the inner mitochondrial membrane and serves the following functions:

- electron transport in the mitochondrial ETC, by shuttling electrons from mitochondrial complexes like nicotinamide adenine dinucleotide (NADH), ubiquinone reductase (complex I), and succinate ubiquinone reductase (complex II), the fatty acids and branched-chain amino acids oxidation (through flavin-linked dehydrogenases) to ubiquinol–cytochrome-c reductase (complex III) of the ETC: CoQ_{10} participates in fatty acid and glucose metabolism by transferring electrons generated from the reduction of fatty acids and glucose to electron acceptors;
- antioxidant activity as a lipid-soluble antioxidant together with vitamin E, scavenging reactive oxygen species and protecting cells against oxidative stress, inhibiting the oxidation of proteins, DNA, and use of vitamin E.

== Biochemistry ==
Coenzyme Q (CoQ) is a quinone and an electron carrier in the mitochondrial electron transport chain (ETC) of eukaryotes and many bacteria. The other name for CoQ is ubiquinone which was assigned by the IUPAC-IUB Commission on Biochemical Nomenclature in 1975 due to its ubiquitous presence from bacteria to humans. In humans the isoprene side chain has ten isoprene units, hence the abbreviation CoQ_{10}.

Coenzyme Q is a coenzyme family that is ubiquitous in animals and many Pseudomonadota, a group of gram-negative bacteria. The fact that the coenzyme is ubiquitous gives the origin of its other name, ubiquinone. In humans, the most common form of coenzyme Q is coenzyme Q_{10}, also called CoQ_{10} (/ˌkoʊkjuːˈtɛn/) or ubiquinone-10.

Coenzyme Q_{10} is a 1,4-benzoquinone, in which "Q" refers to the quinone chemical group and "10" refers to the number of isoprenyl chemical subunits (shown enclosed in brackets in the diagram) in its tail. In natural ubiquinones, there are from six to ten subunits in the tail, with humans having a tail of 10 isoprene units (50 carbon atoms) connected to its benzoquinone "head".

This family of fat-soluble substances is present in all respiring eukaryotic cells, primarily in the mitochondria. Ninety-five percent of the human body's energy is generated this way. Organs with the highest energy requirements—such as the heart, liver, and kidney—have the highest CoQ_{10} concentrations.

There are three redox states of CoQ: fully oxidized (ubiquinone), semiquinone (ubisemiquinone), and fully reduced (ubiquinol). The capacity of this molecule to act as a two-electron carrier (moving between the quinone and quinol form) and a one-electron carrier (moving between the semiquinone and one of these other forms) is central to its role in the electron transport chain due to the iron–sulfur clusters that can only accept one electron at a time and as a free radical–scavenging antioxidant.

== Deficiency ==
There are two major pathways of deficiency of CoQ_{10} in humans: reduced biosynthesis, and increased use by the body. Biosynthesis is the major source of CoQ_{10}. Biosynthesis requires at least 15 genes, and mutations in any of them can cause CoQ deficiency. CoQ_{10} levels also may be affected by other genetic defects (such as mutations of mitochondrial DNA, ETFDH, APTX, FXN, and BRAF, genes that are not directly related to the CoQ_{10} biosynthetic process). Some of these, such as mutations in COQ6, can lead to serious diseases such as steroid-resistant nephrotic syndrome with sensorineural deafness.

=== Assessment ===
Although CoQ_{10} may be measured in blood plasma, these measurements reflect dietary intake rather than tissue status. Currently, most clinical centers measure CoQ_{10} levels in cultured skin fibroblasts, muscle biopsies, and blood mononuclear cells. Culture fibroblasts can be used also to evaluate the rate of endogenous CoQ_{10} biosynthesis, by measuring the uptake of ^{14}C-labeled p-hydroxybenzoate.

CoQ_{10} is studied as an adjunctive therapy to reduce inflammation in periodontitis.

=== Statins ===
Although statins may reduce CoQ_{10} in the blood it is unclear whether they reduce CoQ_{10} in muscle tissue. Evidence does not support that supplementation improves statin side effects.

== Chemical properties ==
The oxidized structure of CoQ_{10} is shown below. The various kinds of coenzyme Q may be distinguished by the number of isoprenoid subunits in their side-chains. The most common coenzyme Q in human mitochondria is CoQ_{10}. Q refers to the quinone head and "10" refers to the number of isoprene repeats in the tail. The molecule below has three isoprenoid units and would be called Q_{3}.

In its pure state, it is an orange-colored lipophile powder and has no taste or odor.

== Biosynthesis ==
Biosynthesis occurs in most human tissue. There are three major steps:

1. Creation of the benzoquinone structure (using phenylalanine or tyrosine, via 4-hydroxybenzoate)
2. Creation of the isoprene side chain (using acetyl-CoA)
3. The joining or condensation of the above two structures

The initial two reactions occur in mitochondria, the endoplasmic reticulum, and peroxisomes, indicating multiple sites of synthesis in animal cells.

An important enzyme in this pathway is HMG-CoA reductase, usually a target for intervention in cardiovascular complications. The "statin" family of cholesterol-reducing medications inhibits HMG-CoA reductase. One possible side effect of statins is decreased production of CoQ_{10}, which may be connected to the development of myopathy and rhabdomyolysis. However, the role statins play in CoQ deficiency is controversial. Although statins reduce blood levels of CoQ, studies on the effects of muscle levels of CoQ are yet to come.

Genes involved include PDSS1, PDSS2, COQ2, and COQ8A.

Organisms other than humans produce the benzoquinone and isoprene structures from somewhat different source chemicals. For example, the bacteria E. coli produces the former from chorismate and the latter from a non-mevalonate source. The common yeast S. cerevisiae, however, derives the former from either chorismate or tyrosine and the latter from mevalonate. Most organisms share the common 4-hydroxybenzoate intermediate, yet again uses different steps to arrive at the "Q" structure.

== Dietary supplement ==
Although neither a prescription drug nor an essential nutrient, CoQ_{10} is commonly used as a dietary supplement with the intent to prevent or improve disease conditions, such as cardiovascular disorders. Despite its significant role in the body, it is not used as a drug to treat any specific disease.

Nevertheless, CoQ_{10} is widely available as an over-the-counter dietary supplement and is recommended by some healthcare professionals, despite a lack of definitive scientific evidence supporting these recommendations, especially when it comes to cardiovascular diseases.

== Regulation and composition ==
CoQ_{10} is not approved by the U.S. Food and Drug Administration (FDA) for the treatment of any medical condition. However, it is sold as a dietary supplement not subject to the same regulations as medicinal drugs, and is an ingredient in some cosmetics and energy drinks. The manufacture of CoQ_{10} is not regulated, and different batches and brands may vary significantly.

== Research ==
A 2014 Cochrane review found insufficient evidence to make a conclusion about its use for the prevention of heart disease. A 2016 Cochrane review concluded that CoQ_{10} had no effect on blood pressure. A 2021 Cochrane review found "no convincing evidence to support or refute" the use of CoQ_{10} for the treatment of heart failure.

A 2017 meta-analysis of people with heart failure taking 30–100 mg/d of CoQ_{10} found a 31% lower mortality and increased exercise capacity, with no significant difference in the endpoints of left heart ejection fraction. A 2021 meta-analysis found that CoQ_{10} was associated with a 31% lower all-cause mortality in HF patients. In a 2023 meta-analysis of older people, ubiquinone had evidence of a cardiovascular effect, but ubiquinol (the reduced form) did not.

Although CoQ_{10} has been studied as a potential remedy to treat purported muscle-related side effects of statin medications, the results were mixed. Although a 2018 meta-analysis concluded that there was preliminary evidence for oral CoQ_{10} reducing statin-associated muscle symptoms, including muscle pain, muscle weakness, muscle cramps, and muscle tiredness, 2015 and 2024 meta-analysis found that CoQ_{10} had no effect on statin myopathy.

== Pharmacology ==
=== Absorption ===
CoQ_{10} in the pure form is a crystalline powder insoluble in water. Absorption as a pharmacological substance follows the same process as that of lipids; the uptake mechanism appears to be similar to that of vitamin E, another lipid-soluble nutrient. This process in the human body involves secretion into the small intestine of pancreatic enzymes and bile, which facilitates emulsification and micelle formation required for absorption of lipophilic substances. Food intake (and the presence of lipids) stimulates bodily biliary excretion of bile acids and greatly enhances absorption of CoQ_{10}. Exogenous CoQ_{10} is absorbed from the small intestine and is best absorbed if taken with a meal. Serum concentration of CoQ_{10} in fed condition is higher than in fasting conditions.

=== Metabolism ===
CoQ_{10} is metabolized in all tissues, with the metabolites phosphorylated in cells. CoQ_{10} is reduced to ubiquinol during or after absorption in the small intestine. It is absorbed by chylomicrons, and redistributed in the blood within lipoproteins. Its elimination occurs via biliary and fecal excretion.

=== Pharmacokinetics ===
Some reports have been published on the pharmacokinetics of CoQ_{10}. The plasma peak can be observed 6–8 hours after oral administration when taken as a pharmacological substance. In some studies, a second plasma peak was observed approximately 24 hours after administration, probably due to enterohepatic recycling and redistribution from the liver to circulation.

Deuterium-labeled crystalline CoQ_{10} was used to investigate pharmacokinetics in humans to determine an elimination half-time of 33 hours.

=== Bioavailability ===
In contrast to the intake of CoQ_{10} as a constituent of food, such as nuts or meat, from which CoQ_{10} is normally absorbed, there is a concern about CoQ_{10} bioavailability when it is taken as a dietary supplement. Bioavailability of CoQ_{10} supplements may be reduced due to the lipophilic nature of its molecule and large molecular weight.

==== Reduction of particle size ====
Nanoparticles have been explored as a delivery system for various drugs, such as improving the oral bioavailability of drugs with poor absorption characteristics. However, this has not proved successful with CoQ_{10}, although reports have differed widely. The use of aqueous suspension of finely powdered CoQ_{10} in pure water also reveals only a minor effect.

==== Water-solubility ====
Facilitating drug absorption by increasing its solubility in water is a common pharmaceutical strategy and also is successful for CoQ_{10}. Various approaches have been developed to achieve this goal, with many of them producing significantly better results over oil-based soft gel capsules despite the many attempts to optimize their composition. Examples of such approaches are use of the aqueous dispersion of solid CoQ_{10} with the polymer tyloxapol, formulations based on various solubilising agents, such as hydrogenated lecithin, and complexation with cyclodextrins; among the latter, the complex with β-cyclodextrin has been found to have highly increased bioavailability and also is used in pharmaceutical and food industries for CoQ_{10}-fortification.

== Adverse effects and precautions ==
Generally, oral CoQ_{10} supplementation is well tolerated. The most common side effects are gastrointestinal symptoms (nausea, vomiting, appetite suppression, and abdominal pain), rashes, and headaches. Some adverse effects, largely gastrointestinal, are reported with intakes. Doses of 100–300 mg per day may induce insomnia or elevate liver enzymes. The observed safe level risk assessment method indicated that the evidence of safety is acceptable at intakes up to 1200 mg per day.

Caution should be observed in the use of CoQ_{10} supplementation in people with bile duct obstruction and during pregnancy or breastfeeding.

== Potential drug interactions ==
CoQ_{10} taken as a pharmacological substance has potential to inhibit the effects of theophylline as well as the anticoagulant warfarin; CoQ_{10} may interfere with warfarin's actions by interacting with cytochrome p450 enzymes thereby reducing the INR, a measure of blood clotting. The structure of CoQ_{10} is similar to that of vitamin K, which competes with and counteracts warfarin's anticoagulation effects. CoQ_{10} is not recommended in people taking warfarin due to the increased risk of clotting.

== Dietary concentrations ==
A detailed review on occurrence of CoQ_{10} and dietary intake was published in 2010. Besides the endogenous synthesis within organisms, CoQ_{10} also is supplied by various foods. CoQ_{10} concentrations in various foods are:

CoQ_{10} levels in selected foods
Food		CoQ_{10} concentration (mg/kg)
Vegetable oils	soybean oil	54–280
Vegetable oils	olive oil	40–160
Vegetable oils	grapeseed oil	64–73
Vegetable oils	sunflower oil	4–15
Vegetable oils	canola oil	64–73
Beef	heart	113
Beef	liver	39–50
Beef	muscle	26–40
Pork	heart	12–128
Pork	liver	23–54
Pork	muscle	14–45
Chicken	breast	8–17
Chicken	thigh	24–25
Chicken	wing	11
Fish	sardine	5–64
Fish	mackerel – red flesh	43–67
Fish	mackerel – white flesh	11–16
Fish	salmon	4–8
Fish	tuna	5
Nuts	peanut	27
Nuts	walnut	19
Nuts	sesame seed	18–23
Nuts	pistachio	20
Nuts	hazelnut	17
Nuts	almond	5–14
Vegetables	parsley	8–26
Vegetables	broccoli	6–9
Vegetables	cauliflower	2–7
Vegetables	spinach	up to 10
Vegetables	Chinese cabbage	2–5
Fruit	avocado	10
Fruit	blackcurrant	3
Fruit	grape	6–7
Fruit	strawberry	1
Fruit	orange	1–2
Fruit	grapefruit	1
Fruit	apple	1
Fruit	banana	1

Vegetable oils, meat, and fish are rich in CoQ_{10}. Dairy products are much poorer sources of CoQ_{10} than animal tissues. Among vegetables, broccoli and cauliflower are good sources of CoQ_{10}. Most fruits and berries are poor sources of CoQ_{10}, except avocados, which have relatively high oil and CoQ_{10} content.

=== Intake ===
In the developed world, the estimated daily intake of CoQ_{10} has been determined at 3–6 mg per day, derived primarily from meat.

South Koreans have an estimated average daily CoQ (Q_{9} + Q_{10}) intake of 11.6 mg/d, derived primarily from kimchi.

=== Effect of heat and processing ===
Cooking by frying reduces CoQ_{10} content by 14–32%.

== History ==
In 1950, a small amount of CoQ_{10} was isolated from the lining of a horse's gut, a compound initially called substance SA, but later deemed to be quinone found in many animal tissues. In 1957, the same compound was isolated from mitochondrial membranes of beef heart, with research showing that it transported electrons within mitochondria. The compound was called Q-275 as a quinone. The Q-275/substance SA was later renamed ubiquinone as it was a 'ubiquitous' quinone found in all animal tissues. In 1958, its full chemical structure was reported. Ubiquinone was later called either mitoquinone or coenzyme Q due to its participation to the mitochondrial electron transport chain. In 1966, a study reported that reduced CoQ_{6} was an effective antioxidant in cells.

== See also ==
- Idebenone – synthetic analog with reduced oxidant-generating properties
- Mitoquinone mesylate – synthetic analog with improved mitochondrial permeability
