= NADH:ubiquinone reductase (non-electrogenic) =

Class of enzymes

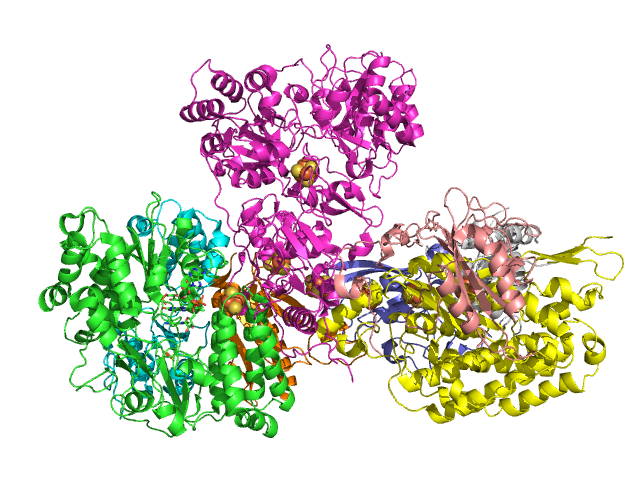
- Structure of NADH dehydrogenase (quinone). PDB entry 3iam

Identifiers
- EC no.: 1.6.5.9
- CAS no.: 9028-04-0

Databases
- BRENDA: enzyme data
- ExPASy: NiceZyme view
- KEGG: enzyme entry
- MetaCyc: metabolic pathway
- Rhea: reactions
- PDB structures: RCSB PDB PDBe PDBsum
- Gene Ontology: AmiGO / QuickGO
Search
- PMC: articles
- PubMed: articles
- NCBI: proteins

NADH:ubiquinone reductase (non-electrogenic) (EC 1.6.5.9, NDH-2, ubiquinone reductase, coenzyme Q reductase, dihydronicotinamide adenine dinucleotide-coenzyme Q reductase, DPNH-coenzyme Q reductase, DPNH-ubiquinone reductase, NADH-coenzyme Q oxidoreductase, NADH-coenzyme Q reductase, NADH-CoQ oxidoreductase, NADH-CoQ reductase) is an enzyme with systematic name NADH:ubiquinone oxidoreductase. This enzyme catalyses the following chemical reaction:

NADH + H^{+} + a quinone $\rightleftharpoons$ NAD^{+} + a quinol

The 3 substrates of this enzyme are NADH, H^{+}, and a quinone (electron acceptor), whereas its two products are NAD^{+} and a quinol (reduced acceptor). This enzyme is found in aerobic bacteria and the mitochondria of yeast and plants. In many other organisms (notably the mitochondria of animals), there is a similar enzyme called respiratory complex I, which differs from this enzyme in that it also pumps protons.

An important example of this reaction is:

NADH + H^{+} + ubiquinone $\rightleftharpoons$ NAD^{+} + ubiquinol

This enzyme is a flavoprotein (FAD). It belongs to the family of oxidoreductases, specifically those acting on NADH or NADPH with other acceptors. The systematic name of this enzyme class is NADH:(quinone-acceptor) oxidoreductase. Other names in common use include reduced nicotinamide adenine dinucleotide (quinone) dehydrogenase, NADH-quinone oxidoreductase, NADH ubiquinone oxidoreductase, DPNH-menadione reductase, D-diaphorase, and NADH2 dehydrogenase (quinone), and mitochondrial (mt) complex I. This enzyme participates in oxidative phosphorylation. Several compounds are known to inhibit this enzyme, including AMP, and 2,4-dinitrophenol. NADH dehydrogenase is involved in the first step of the electron transport chain of oxidative phosphorylation (OXPHOS). Any change in the electron transport component caused by a mutation might effect the normal electron flow. This might be leading "an increase of bifurcation and generation of superoxidase radicals and increase oxidative stress in various types of cancer cells."

== Structural studies ==
Several structures are available of this enzyme, which is part of the respiratory chain. It is a multi-subunit enzyme in which this activity is located in the hydrophilic domain. The subunits of the membrane-embedded domain are responsible for proton translocation.
