= NADH dehydrogenase =

Class of enzymes

Identifiers
- EC no.: 7.1.1.2
- CAS no.: 9079-67-8
- Alt. names: cytochrome c reductase, type 1 dehydrogenase, beta-NADH dehydrogenase dinucleotide, diaphorase, dihydrocodehydrogenase I dehydrogenase, dihydronicotinamide adenine dinucleotide dehydrogenase, diphosphopyridine diaphorase, DPNH diaphorase, NADH diaphorase, NADH hydrogenase, NADH oxidoreductase, NADH-menadione oxidoreductase, reduced diphosphopyridine nucleotide diaphorase

Databases
- BRENDA: enzyme data
- ExPASy: NiceZyme view
- KEGG: enzyme entry
- MetaCyc: metabolic pathway
- Rhea: reactions
- PDB structures: RCSB PDB PDBe PDBsum
Search
- PMC: articles
- PubMed: articles
- NCBI: proteins

NADH dehydrogenase is an enzyme that converts nicotinamide adenine dinucleotide (NAD) from its reduced form (NADH) to its oxidized form (NAD^{+}). Members of the NADH dehydrogenase family and analogues are commonly systematically named using the format NADH:acceptor oxidoreductase. The chemical reaction these enzymes catalyze is generally represented with the following equation:

NADH + H^{+} + acceptor ⇌ NAD^{+} + reduced acceptor

NADH dehydrogenase is a flavoprotein that contains iron-sulfur centers.

There are two main enzymes often referred to as NADH dehydrogenase, both involving a quinone as an acceptor. NADH dehydrogenase (H(+)-translocating), also known as Complex I (EC 7.1.1.2) is an proton pump which is part of the electron transport chain which is vital for ATP production in eukaroyotes. The other type, NADH dehydrogenase (non-energetic) (EC 1.6.5.9) refers to an enzyme found in yeast, plants, and some aerobic bacteria that catalyzes a similar reaction, but without pumping protons.
