= Rumpff =

Rumpff is a surname. Notable people with the surname include:

- Carl Rumpff (1839–1889), German business executive and philanthropist
- Frans Lourens Herman Rumpff (1912–1992), South African chief justice
- Vincent Rumpff (1789–1867), German diplomat

== See also ==
- Rumpf
