= Johann Friedrich Weskott =

German master dyer and co-founder of Bayer AG

Friedrich Weskott
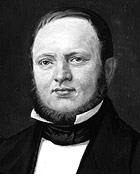
- Weskott, c. 1865
- Born: Johann Friedrich Weskott; October 8, 1821; Elberfeld, now Wuppertal, Germany
- Died: October 4, 1876 (aged 54); Barmen, now Wuppertal, Germany
- Occupations: Master dyer, industrialist
- Organization: Friedr. Bayer et comp.
- Known for: Co-founder of Bayer
- Spouse: Caroline Lüttringhaus (m. 1848; d. 1858) Lisette Cramer (m. 1859)
- Children: 4, including Friedrich ("Fritz") Weskott

Johann Friedrich Weskott (8 October 1821 – 4 October 1876) was a German master dyer and industrialist who co-founded the dyestuffs firm Friedr. Bayer et comp. in 1863 with Friedrich Bayer. The partnership, initially focused on synthetic coal-tar (aniline) dyes such as fuchsine, grew into the company later known as Bayer AG.

== Life ==
Weskott was born in Elberfeld (now part of Wuppertal) and received his schooling in nearby Langerfeld. In 1837 he began an apprenticeship as a dyer at the firm Karthaus & Otto in Barmen. In 1848 he established his own cotton-yarn dyeing business, first in rented premises in Heckinghausen and later in Barmen-Rittershausen; among his principal customers was the local sewing-thread and braiding company Barthels & Feldhoff.

Through his long-standing friendship with the dye salesman Friedrich Bayer, Weskott started experimenting in 1862 with the new synthetic coal-tar dyestuffs that had recently been developed in Britain. Their successful trials and initial sales led the partners to found Friedr. Bayer et comp. on 1 August 1863 in Barmen. In the division of labor that followed, Bayer concentrated on commercial matters and international sales, while Weskott led technical production and tested dyestuffs for practical suitability. Early activities centered on aniline dyes, including fuchsine, which began to displace traditional natural dyestuffs in the textile trade.

The enterprise expanded rapidly. A site at the west end of Elberfeld was acquired a few years after the founding, and in 1878 the company moved its headquarters and most production facilities there. At the time of the relocation the "Elberfelder Farbenfabriken" employed around 200 people. After Bayer's death in 1880, the firm was converted in 1881 into the joint-stock company Farbenfabriken vorm. Friedr. Bayer & Co.

Weskott suffered from chronic lung disease and died in Barmen on 4 October 1876, aged 54.

== Family ==
Weskott was the son of Engelbert Weskott, a natural-yarn dyer, and Anna Maria Vieth. He married twice: first, in 1848, to Caroline Lüttringhaus (d. 1858), with whom he had two children, Laura (1849–1920) and Friedrich ("Fritz") Jr. (1850–1941); and second, in 1859, to Lisette Cramer (1824–1894), with whom he had two more children, Alwine (1861–1919) and Rudolf (1863–1903). Several descendants later held roles in the successor companies.

Descendants of both Weskott and Bayer also worked for the company. Weskott's son, Friedrich ("Fritz") Jr., became a partner in 1877 and served as a member of both the management board and the supervisory board of Farbenfabriken vorm. Friedr. Bayer & Co. from 1881 to 1887. Weskott's grandson, Friedrich Richard, joined the firm in 1896; he became a deputy board member in 1921 and a full board member from 1926 to 1936 (from 1925 as part of IG Farbenindustrie AG).

== Legacy ==
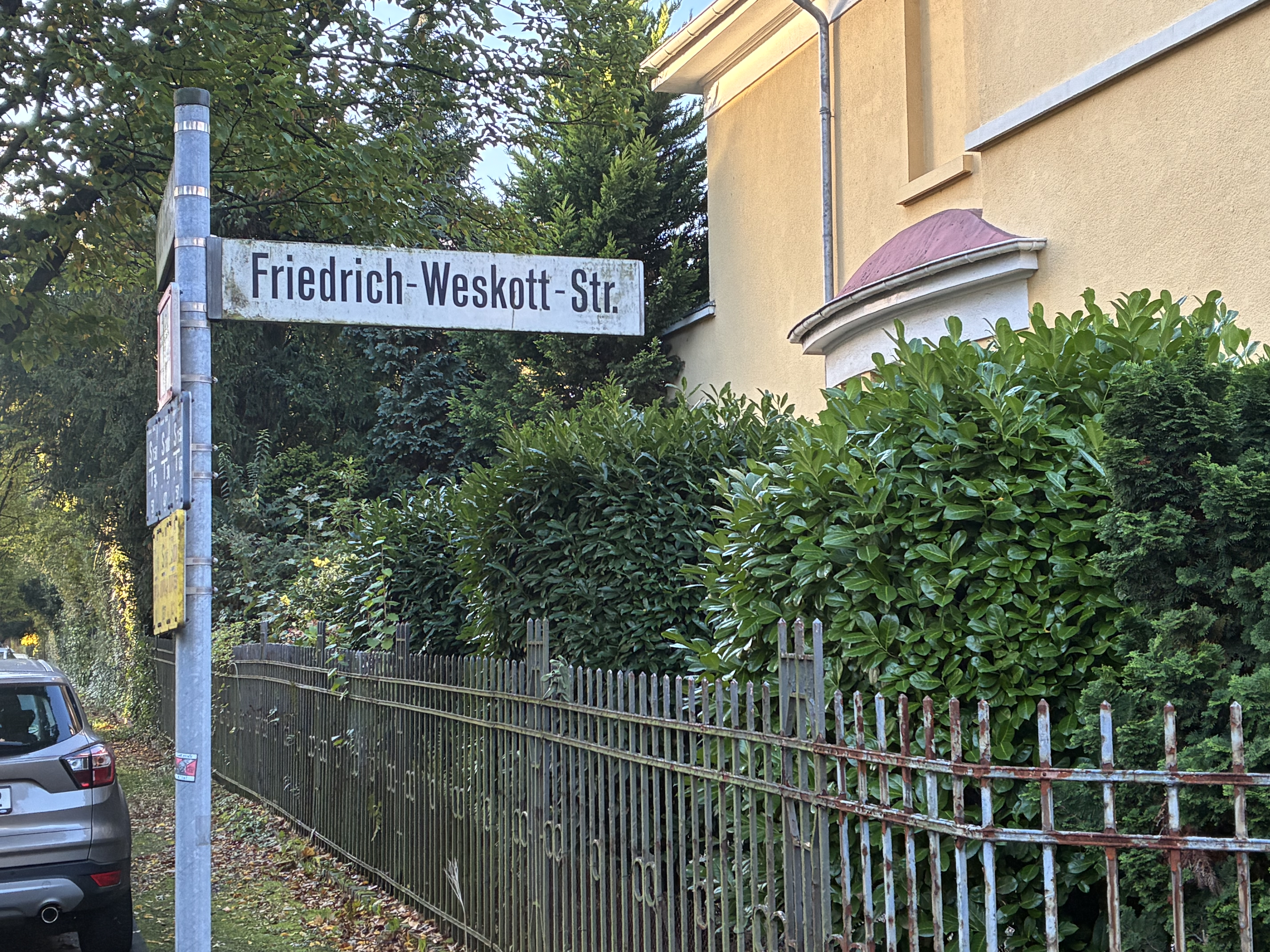
Friedrich-Weskott-Street, Leverkusen, Germany

Weskott is widely recognized, together with Bayer, as a founding figure of Bayer AG. A street in Leverkusen-Wiesdorf (Friedrich-Weskott-Straße) has borne his name since 1926. Accounts of Bayer's early years consistently note the complementary partnership between the salesman Bayer and the master dyer Weskott in establishing a leading dyestuffs enterprise.
