= Martin Blank (politician) =

German politician (1897–1972)

Member of the Bundestag
- In office 7 September 1949 – 6 October 1957

Member of the European Parliament
- In office 16 July 1952 – 29 October 1957

Personal details
- Born: 5 February 1897 Barmen
- Died: 11 March 1972 (aged 75)
- Party: FDP

Martin Blank (5 February 1897 – 11 March 1972) was a German politician of the Free Democratic Party (FDP) and former member of the German Bundestag.

== Life ==
Blank had been a member of the German Bundestag since the first federal election in 1949 until 1957. From 1953 until he left the party, he was Parliamentary Secretary of the FDP parliamentary group. From 16 July 1952 to 29 October 1957 Blank was also a member of the European Parliament, where he was chairman of the Committee on Budget and Administration.

== Literature ==
Herbst, Ludolf; Jahn, Bruno (2002). Vierhaus, Rudolf (ed.). Biographisches Handbuch der Mitglieder des Deutschen Bundestages. 1949–2002 [Biographical Handbook of the Members of the German Bundestag. 1949–2002] (in German). München: De Gruyter - De Gruyter Saur. p. 1715. ISBN 978-3-11-184511-1.
