= SSV Barmen =

German football club

- Full name: Sport- und Spielvereinigung e.V. Barmen
- Founded: 1906
- League: defunct
Home colours	Away colours

SSV Barmen was a German association football club from Barmen in the city of Wuppertal, North Rhine-Westphalia. The club became part of ASV Wuppertal in a 1970 merger with VfB Wuppertal, Eintracht Wuppertal, and Viktoria Wuppertal.

== History ==
The origins of SSV go back to the 1906 founding of Sport Club Germania Rott. That club merged with Fußball Club Olympia Barmen to form Barmer Spielverein 06 which joined Sportverein 07 Carnap on 27 August 1920 to become Sport- und Spielvereinigung Barmen. The club was renamed Sportgemeinde Blau-Gelb Wuppertal in 1929 before again taking up the name SSVg Barmen in 1939.

During World War II, SSV played alongside Sportfreunde Schwarz-Weiß Wuppertal and TuRA Wuppertal as the wartime club Kriegsspielgemeinschaft Wuppertal-Barmen from 1943 to 1945. SSV played a single season in the postwar Bezirksliga Berg-Mark (II) in 1946–47. The team also played two seasons in the Amateurliga Niederrhein (II) in 1947–48 and 1951–52. The Barmen side disappeared into the newly formed Allgemeiner Sport-Verein Wuppertal on 11 June 1970.

== Stadium ==
From 1920 to 1945, SSV played in Schützenstaße, before moving to Am Gelben Sprung – which also served as the home ground for the newly formed ASV in its inaugural 1970–71 season.
