= Barmen =

Former city in eastern Rhineland, Germany

Coordinates: 51°16′N 7°12′E

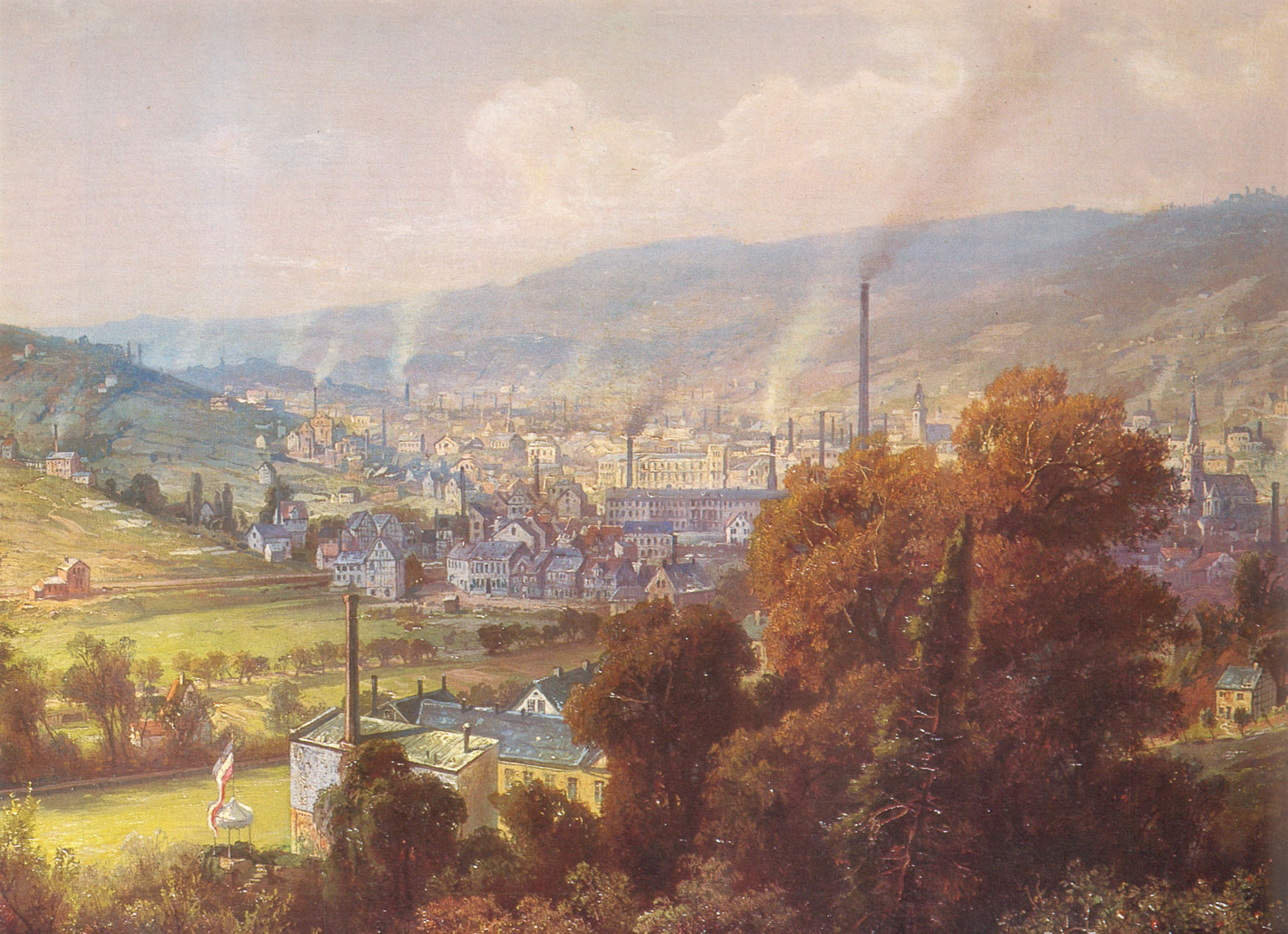
Barmen in 1870. Painting by August von Wille

Barmen is a former industrial metropolis of the region of Bergisches Land, Germany, which merged with four other towns in 1929 to form the city of Wuppertal.

Barmen, together with the neighbouring town of Elberfeld founded the first electric suspended monorail tramway system, the Schwebebahn floating tram.

== History ==
Barmen was a pioneering centre for both the early Industrial Revolution on the European mainland, and for the socialist movement and its theory. It was the location of one of the first concentration camps in Nazi Germany, KZ Wuppertal-Barmen, later better known as Kemna concentration camp.

Oberbarmen (Upper Barmen) is the eastern part of Barmen, and Unterbarmen (Lower Barmen) the western part.

One of its claims to fame is the fact that Friedrich Engels, co-author of The Communist Manifesto, was born in Barmen. Another of its claims is the fact that Bayer AG was founded there by Friedrich Bayer and master dyer Johann Friedrich Weskott with the express purpose to erect and operate a dyeworks.

== Legacy ==
The asteroid 118173 Barmen is named in its honour, celebrating the 1934 Synod which issued the Barmen Declaration defining Protestant opposition to National-Socialist ideology.

== Personalities ==
- Friedrich Engels (1820–1895), Marxist philosopher
- Julius Kemna (1837–1898), entrepreneur and company founder
- Adolph Coors (1847–1929), brewer, Coors Brewing, Golden, Colorado
- Hermann Ebbinghaus (1850–1909), psychologist
- Julius Richard Petri (1852–1921), microbiologist
- Wilhelm Dörpfeld (1853–1940), architect and archaeologist
- Carl Duisberg (1861–1935), chemist and industrialist
- Ferdinand Sauerbruch (1875–1951), surgeon
- Adeline Rittershaus (1876–1924), philologist and champion for the equality of women
- Johann Viktor Bredt (1879–1940), jurist and politician
- Else Brökelschen (1879–1976), politician (CDU)
- Max Bockmühl (1882–1949), chemist
- Rudolf Carnap (1891–1970), member of the Vienna Circle of positivists
- Bernhard Letterhaus (1894–1944), trade unionist and politician
- Wilhelm Philipps (1894–1971), generalleutnant
- Robert Tillmanns (1896–1955), politician (CDU)
- Hans Peter Luhn (1896–1964), researcher in the field of computer science and creator of the Luhn algorithm
- Martin Blank (1897–1972), politician (FDP)
- Friedrich-Wilhelm Müller (1897–1947), "The Butcher of Crete"
- Walter Julius Bloem (1898–1945), author and recipient of the Iron Cross
- Liselotte Schaak (1908–1996), actress
- Bernd Klug (1914–1975), admiral
- Kurt Brand (1917–1991), science-fiction author
- Reimar Lüst (1923–2020), astrophysicist
- Siegfried Palm (1927–2005), cellist
- Johannes Rau (1931–2006), SPD politician and President of Germany 1999-2004

== Population ==
Historical population
Year	Pop.	±%
1591	1,000	—
1640	1,900	+90.0%
1800	12,000	+531.6%
1810	16,289	+35.7%
1816	19,030	+16.8%
1840	30,847	+62.1%
1875	86,504	+180.4%
1890	116,144	+34.3%
1900	141,947	+22.2%
1905	156,148	+10.0%
1910	169,214	+8.4%
1919	156,326	−7.6%
1925	187,099	+19.7%

== See also ==
- SSV Barmen
