= Friedrich Bayer =

German businessman (1825-1880)

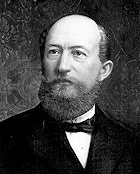
- Born: Friedrich Beyer; 6 June 1825; Barmen, Kingdom of Prussia
- Died: 6 May 1880 (aged 54); Würzburg, Kingdom of Bavaria
- Known for: Founder of Bayer AG

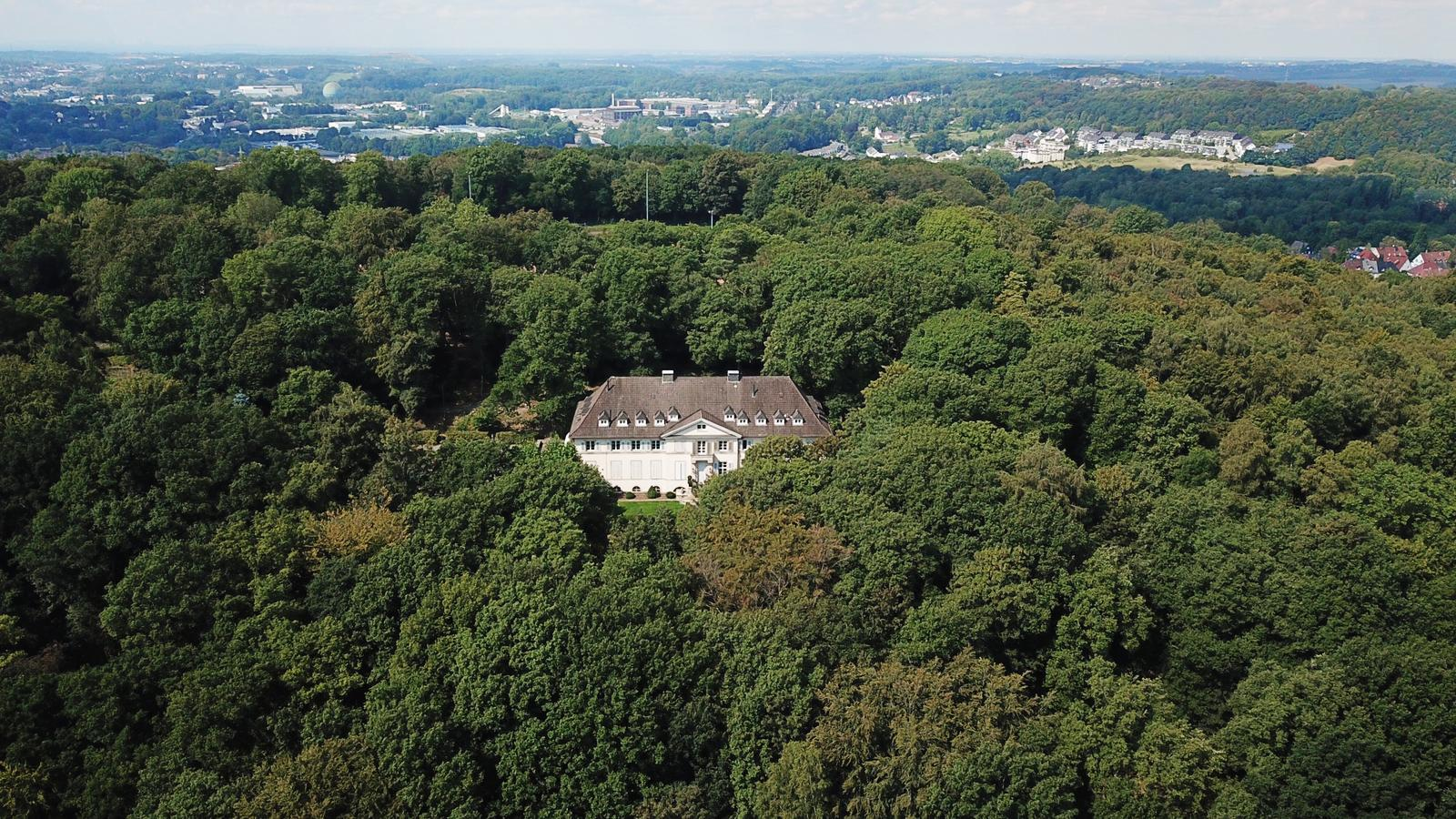
Haus Höhe, Designed by Carl Conradi for Friedrich Bayer

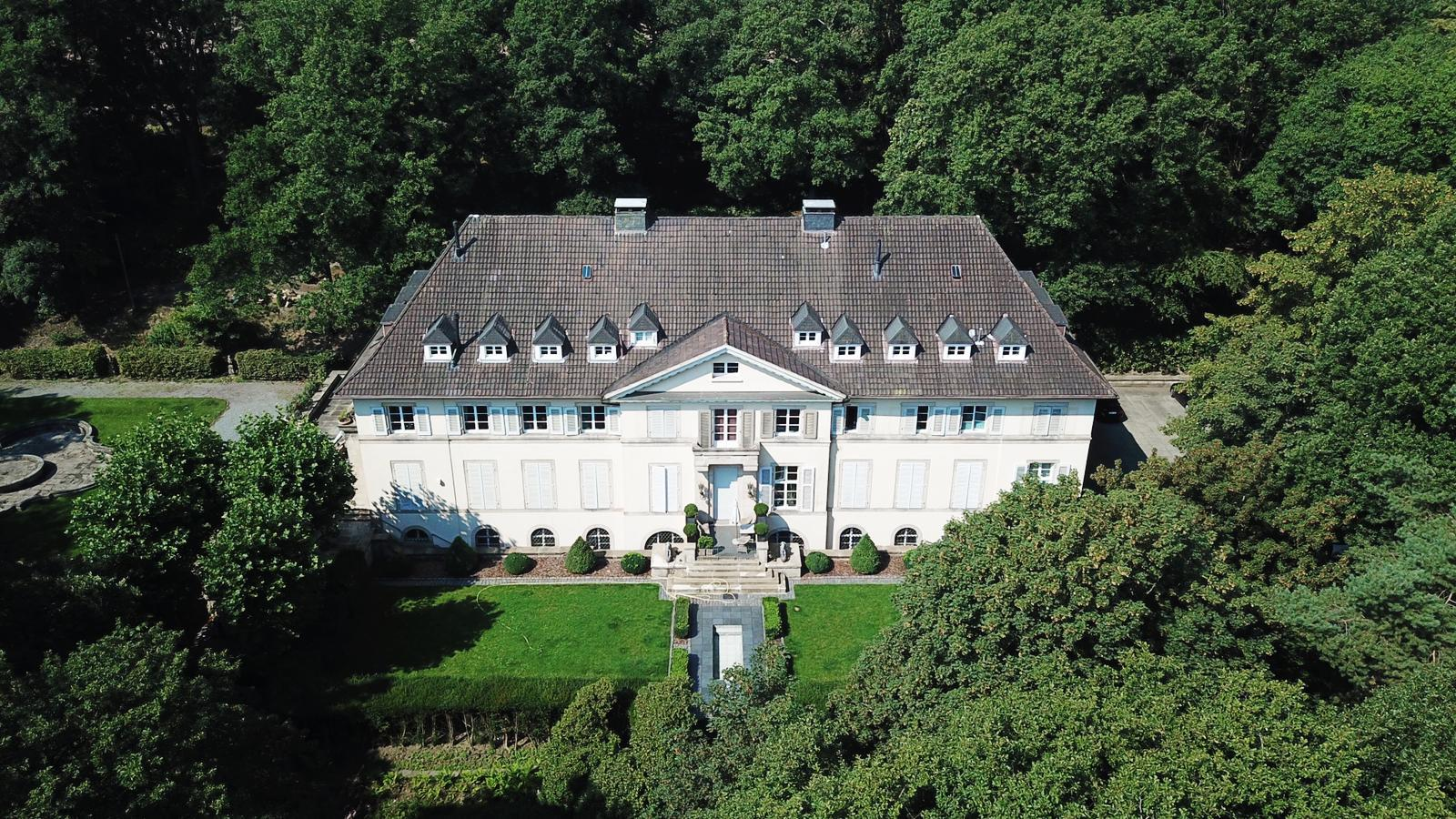
Haus Höhe, Designed by Carl Conradi for Friedrich Bayer

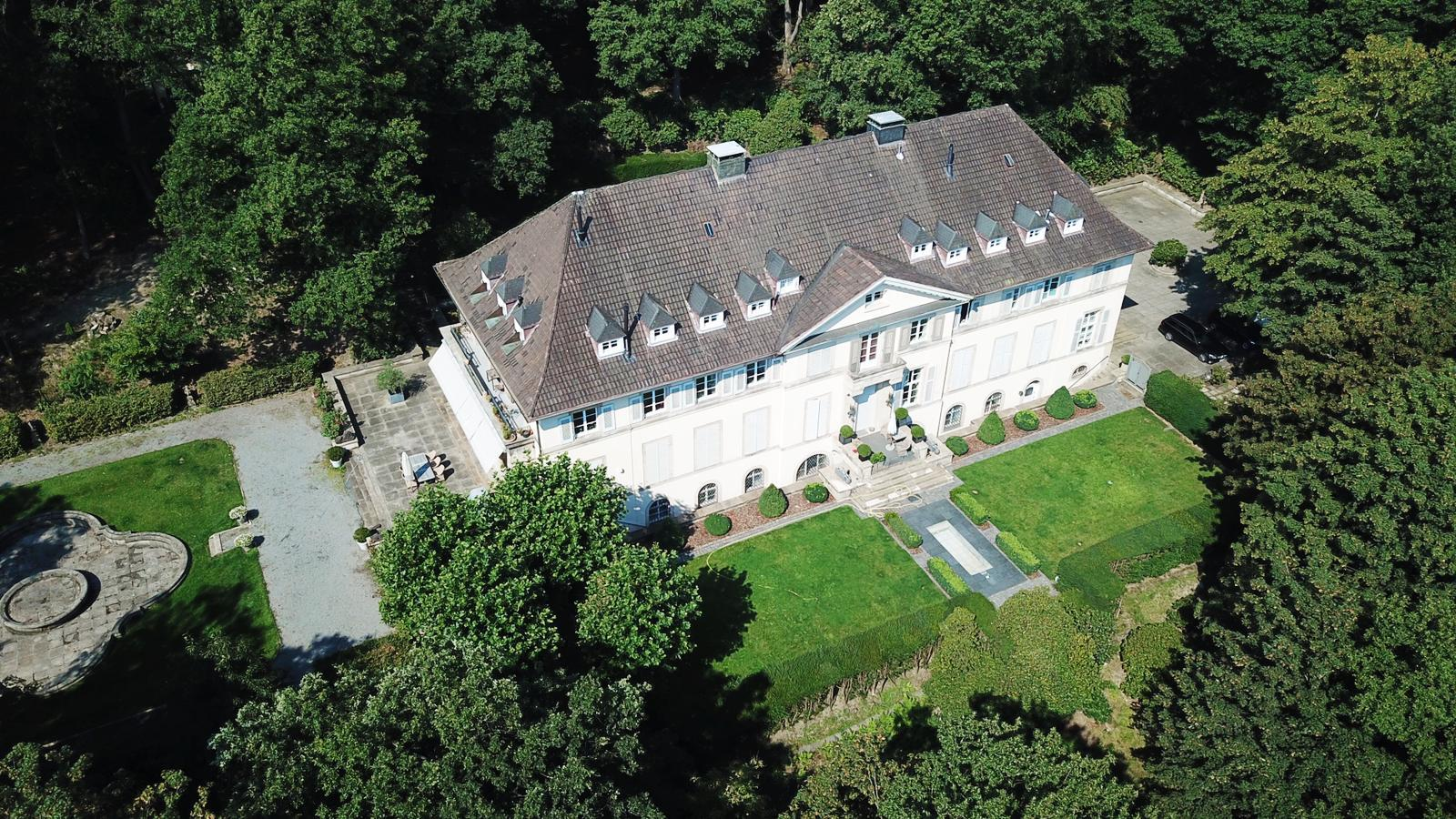
Haus Höhe, Designed by Carl Conradi for Friedrich Bayer

Friedrich Bayer (born Friedrich Beyer; 6 June 1825 – 6 May 1880) was the founder of what would become Bayer, a German chemical and pharmaceutical company. He founded the dyestuff factory Friedrich Bayer along with Johann Friedrich Weskott in 1863 in Elberfeld, a flourishing city in the early industrialised region of the Wuppertal or Wupper Valley.

Friedrich Bayer changed the spelling of his surname from Beyer in his early twenties, due to the publicity gained by a fraudulent merchant from Leipzig bearing the same name. Friedrich Beyer from Barmen feared that the bad reputation of his namesake could damage his business and consequently changed his surname to Bayer.

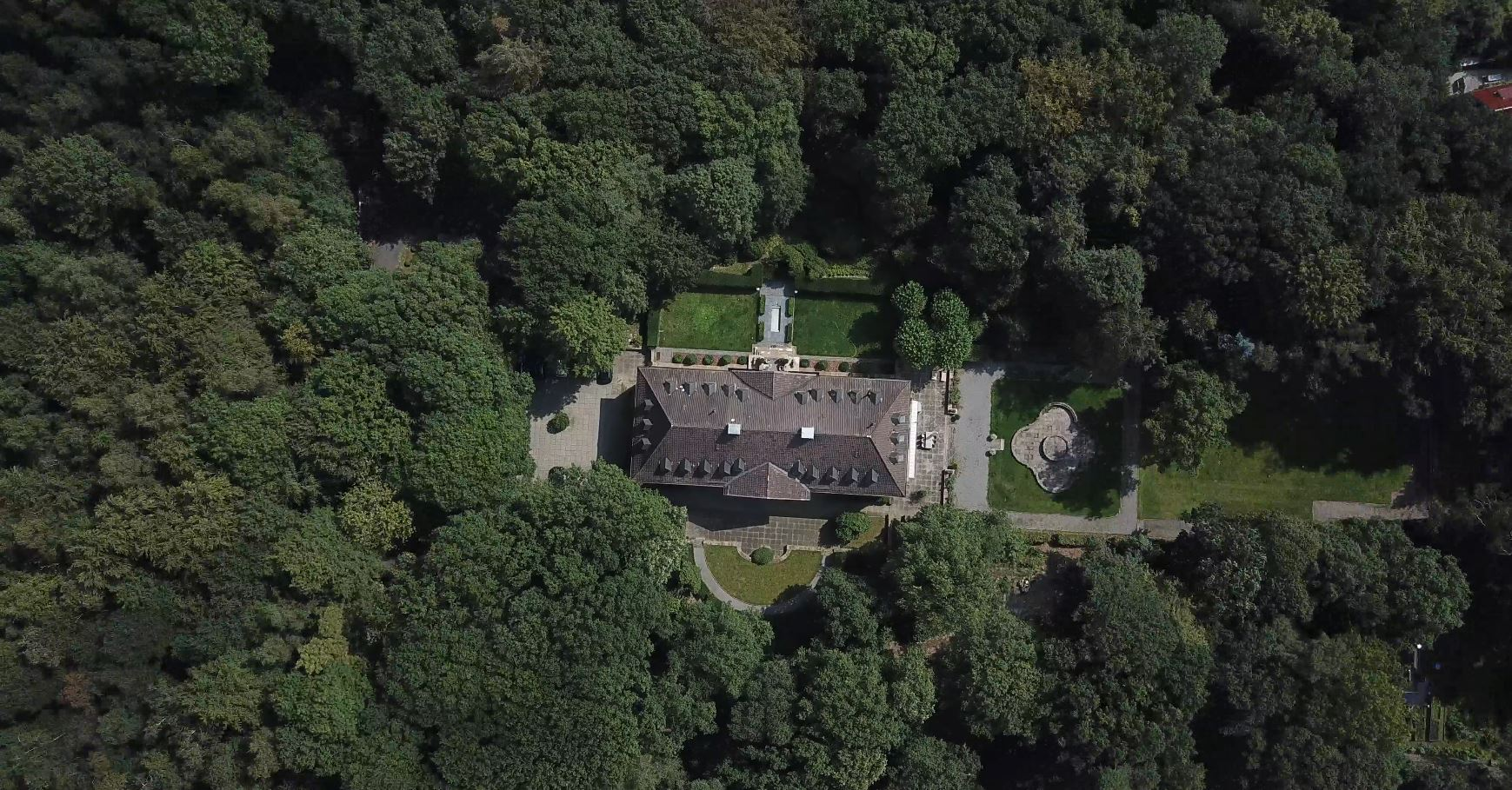
Haus Höhe, Designed by Carl Conradi for Friedrich Bayer

== Life and work ==
The founder and namesake of what later became the Bayer Group was born as the son of the silk weaver Peter Heinrich Friedrich Beyer (d. 1839) and his wife Maria Catharina, née Utermann. His grandfather had also been a silk ribbon weaver in Barmen and came from a family of cloth merchants in Nördlingen. The family, which can be traced back to the 16th century, originally came from Weickersdorf in Upper Lusatia, Saxony, where the word "bajer" means a storyteller.

At the age of fourteen, he began an apprenticeship at the chemical trading company Wesenfeld & Co. in Barmen. There, Bayer (then still spelled "Beyer") became familiar with the basic principles and challenges of the dyeing industry.

By the age of twenty, Bayer had begun trading in natural dyes. Three years later he founded his first trading business and built a distribution network across Europe. The natural dyes he initially offered were extracted from dyewoods and, owing to their high quality, were sold to major European cities including London, Brussels, and Saint Petersburg, and even as far as New York City.

At about the same time, a fraudulent merchant named Friedrich Beyer from Leipzig gained notoriety. Friedrich Beyer of Barmen feared that the poor reputation of his namesake might damage his own business and therefore changed the spelling of his surname to Bayer (with "ay").

On 13 September 1848, Bayer married Caroline Juliane Hülsenbusch (4 March 1829 – 6 January 1899). The couple had five children. After Bayer's death, his son Friedrich assumed the management of the company. His daughter Clara Bayer (1854–1938) married Carl Rumpff in 1871 and, after his death in 1890, the landowner and senior government official Carl Freiherr von Gamp-Massaunen, with whom she had three kids, including the painter Botho von Gamp (Friedrich's grandson). Another daughter, Adele Bayer (born 26 August 1856), married Henry Theodore Böttinger.

Advances in organic chemistry in the field of dye manufacturing and the associated market potential encouraged Bayer to diversify his sales programme. The coal tar dyes Aniline blue and Fuchsine, which Bayer initially imported, surpassed natural dyes in purity and brilliance. Together with his later partner Johann Friedrich Weskott, Bayer began experimenting with the production and testing of these coal-tar dyes from 1861 onward. They succeeded in producing dyes that were superior in quality to those of the first generation.

The successful cooperation between Bayer and Weskott led to the establishment of a small fuchsine production facility in Heckinghausen. This early nucleus of what would later become Bayer AG was entered into the local commercial register on 1 August 1863 under the name Friedr Bayer et comp. Within the young company, Bayer took charge of commercial management while Weskott oversaw technical operations. In 1867 the fuchsine operation was moved to Elberfeld, while aniline production continued in Heckinghausen. The employees August Stiller and Eduard Tust were admitted as partners.

Thanks to further developments in dyes based on aniline, fuchsine and Alizarin, the founders were able to significantly expand production capacity despite an increasingly difficult economic climate.

However, production also created considerable environmental problems. The manufacture of fuchsine produced arsenic, which contaminated the wells of neighbouring properties. When compensation demands from neighbours became too high, Bayer and Weskott moved production in 1866 and, in 1878, relocated the company headquarters to Elberfeld (now part of Wuppertal). For its time, the Elberfeld facility was considered relatively advanced in terms of environmental protection and worker safety.

Bayer died in 1880 at the age of 54 while travelling, as a result of complications from pleurisy. At the time of his death, he left behind a family company employing two authorised signatories, 14 chemists, one engineer, 14 commercial employees, 15 foremen and about 340 workers. The sons and sons-in-law of the founders (including Henry Theodore Böttinger) remained closely connected to the company as partners.

== Gallery ==
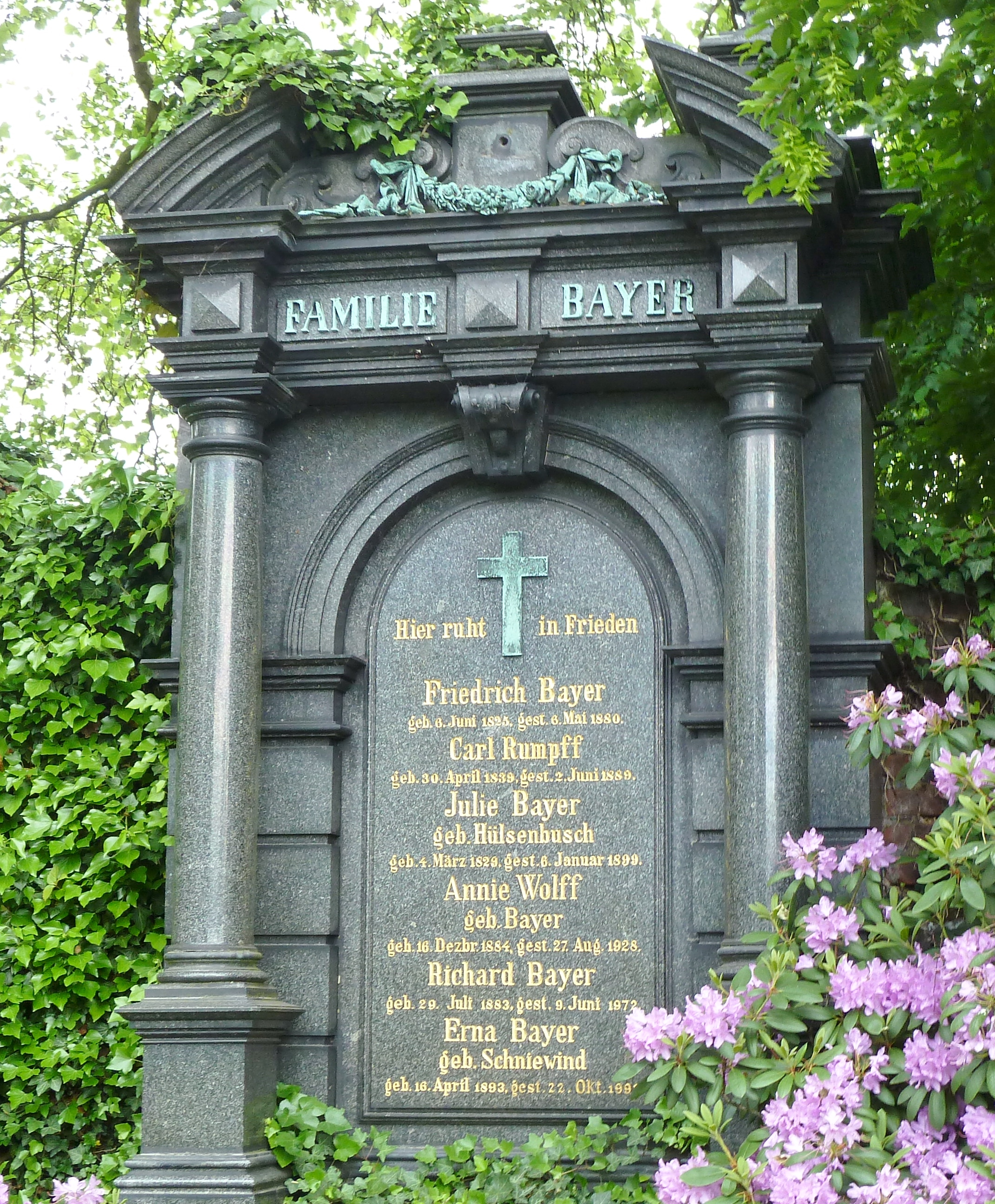
Friedrich Bayer grave site, Wuppertal

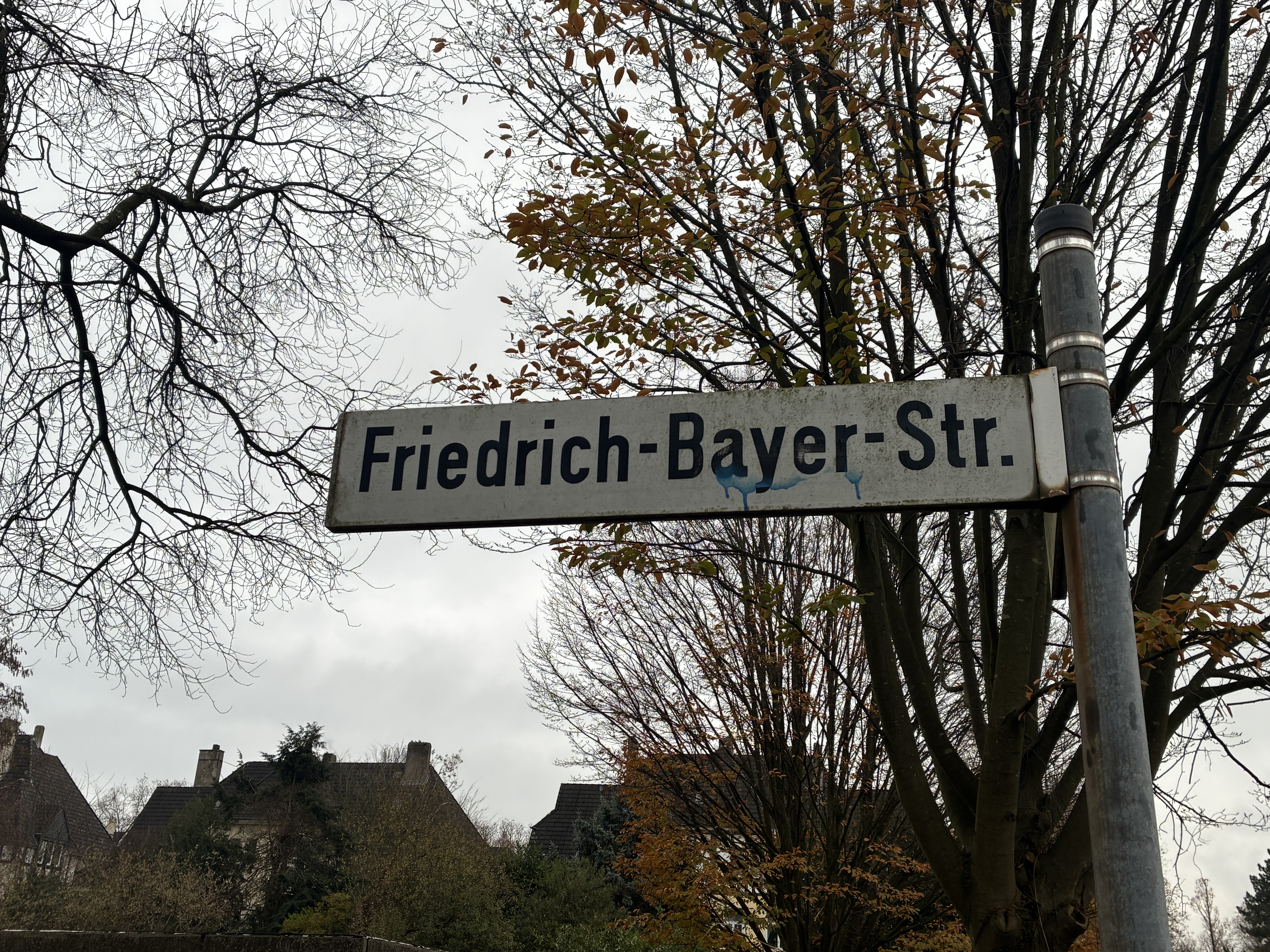
Street name sign, Friedrich-Bayer-Straße, Leverkusen, Germany
