= Carl Rumpff =

German business executive

Carl Heinrich Christian Ludwig Rumpff (born 30 April 1839, died 2 June 1889) was a German business executive and philanthropist, who served as the first Chairman of Bayer. He was the son-in-law of Friedrich Bayer, the company's founder, following his 1871 marriage to Clara Bayer. From 1872 he was also a co-owner of the company.

Rumpff was a collector of minerals. His collection included items purchased from Archduke Stephan. After his death, his collection was donated to the Natural History Museum, Berlin.
