= Bayer =

German multinational pharmaceutical and biotechnology company

Bayer AG

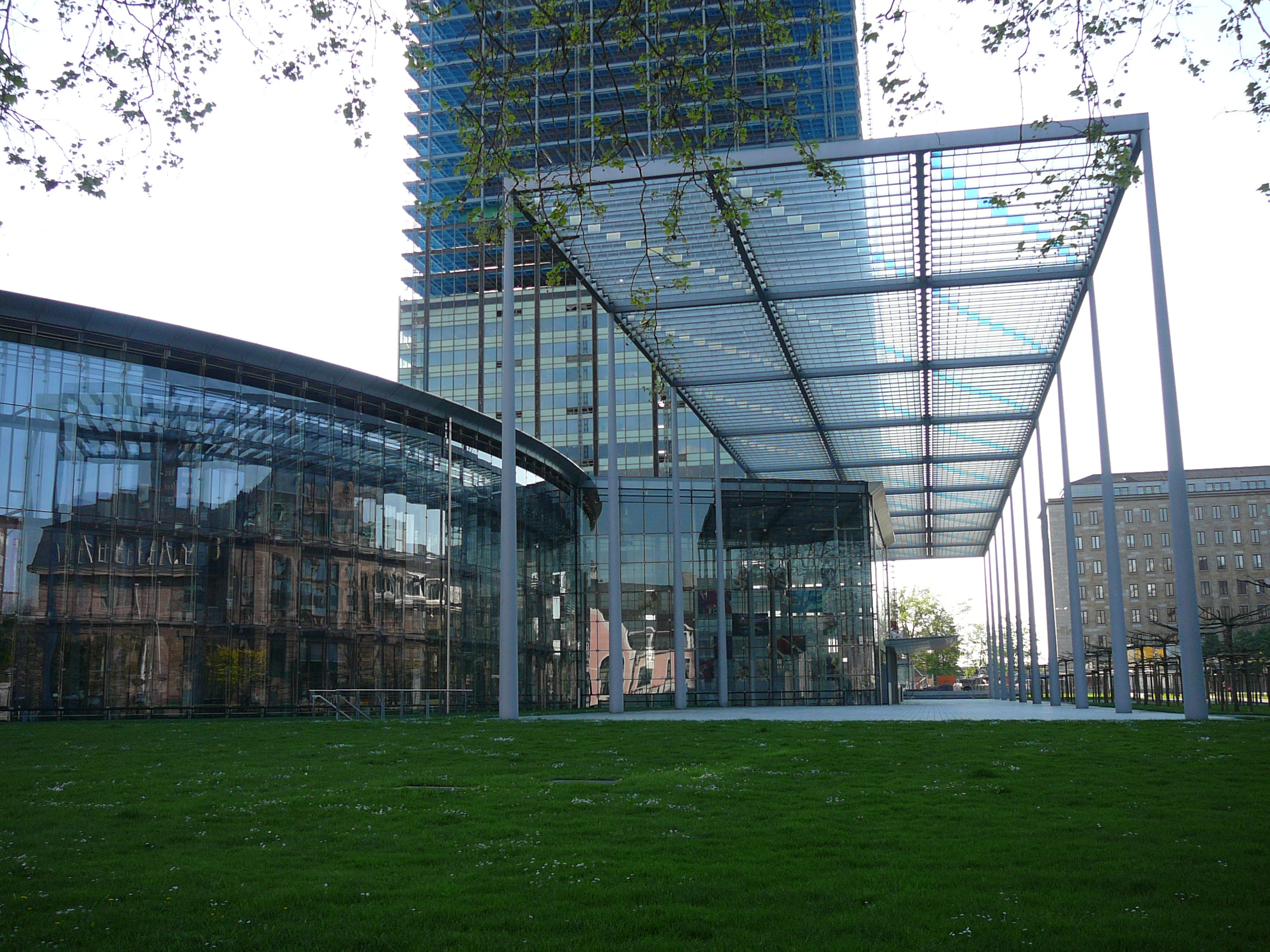
- Headquarters in Leverkusen
- Type: Public
- Traded as: FWB: BAYN; DAX component; Euro Stoxx 50 component
- Industry: Pharmaceuticals; Chemicals; Biotechnology; Healthcare
- Founded: 1 August 1863; 163 years ago
- Founder: Friedrich Bayer
- Headquarters: Leverkusen, North Rhine-Westphalia, Germany
- Area served: Worldwide
- Key people: Bill Anderson (CEO); Norbert Winkeljohann (chairman of the supervisory board)
- Products: Prescription pharmaceuticals; diagnostic imaging; therapeutics; over-the-counter drugs; pesticides; seeds; plant biotechnology
- Revenue: ▼€46.6 billion (2024)
- Operating income: ▼€−71 million (2024)
- Net income: ▲€−2.6 billion (2024)
- Total assets: ▲€102 billion (2024)
- Total equity: ▲€43.3 billion (2024)
- Number of employees: ▼87,830 (June 30, 2026)
- Website: bayer.com

Bayer AG (English: /ˈbaɪ.ər/, commonly pronounced /ˈbeɪər/; German: [ˈbaɪɐ]) is a German multinational pharmaceutical and biotechnology company and is one of the largest pharmaceutical companies and biomedical companies in the world. Headquartered in Leverkusen, Bayer's areas of business include pharmaceuticals, consumer healthcare products, agricultural chemicals, seeds and biotechnology products. The company is a component of the EURO STOXX 50 stock market index.

Bayer was founded in 1863 in Barmen as a partnership between dye salesman Friedrich Bayer (1825–1880) and dyer Johann Friedrich Weskott (1821–1876). The company was established as a dyestuffs producer, but the versatility of aniline chemistry led Bayer to expand its business into other areas. In 1899, Bayer launched the compound acetylsalicylic acid under the trademarked name Aspirin. Aspirin is on the World Health Organization's List of Essential Medicines. In 2021, it was the 34th most commonly prescribed medication in the United States, with more than 17 million prescriptions.

In 1904, Bayer received a trademark for the "Bayer Cross" logo, which was, from 1910, subsequently stamped onto each aspirin tablet, creating an enduring brand image. Other commonly known products initially commercialized by Bayer include heroin, phenobarbital, polyurethanes, and polycarbonates.

In 1925, Bayer merged with five other German companies to form IG Farben, creating the world's largest chemical and pharmaceutical company. The first sulfonamide and the first systemically active antibacterial drug, forerunner of antibiotics, Prontosil, was developed by a research team led by Gerhard Domagk in 1932 or 1933 at the Bayer Laboratories. Following World War II, the Allied Control Council seized IG Farben's assets (Note: Peter Hayes (Cambridge University Press, 2001): "[O]ne of the first acts of the American occupation authorities in 1945 was to seize the enterprise as punishment for 'knowingly and prominently ... building up and maintaining German war potential'. Two years later, twenty-three of the firm's principal officers went on trial ... By the time John McCloy, the American high commissioner [for Germany], pardoned the last of them in 1951, IG Farben scarcely existed. Its holdings in the German Democratic Republic had been nationalized; those in the Federal Republic had been divided into six, later chiefly three, separate corporations: BASF, Bayer, and Hoechst.") because of its role in the Nazi war effort and involvement in the Holocaust, including using slave labour from concentration camps and humans for dangerous medical testing, and production of Zyklon B, a chemical used in gas chambers. In 1951, IG Farben was split into its constituent companies, and Bayer was reincorporated as Farbenfabriken Bayer AG. After the war, Bayer re-hired several former Nazis to high-level positions, including convicted Nazi war criminals found guilty at the IG Farben Trial, such as Fritz ter Meer, following his brief incarceration. Bayer played a key role in the Wirtschaftswunder in post-war West Germany, quickly regaining its position as one of the world's largest chemical and pharmaceutical corporations.

In 2016, Bayer merged with the American multinational Monsanto in what was the biggest acquisition by a German company to date. Due to significant financial and reputational damage of ongoing litigation concerning Monsanto's herbicide Roundup, it is considered one of the worst corporate mergers in history.

== Early history ==
=== Foundation ===
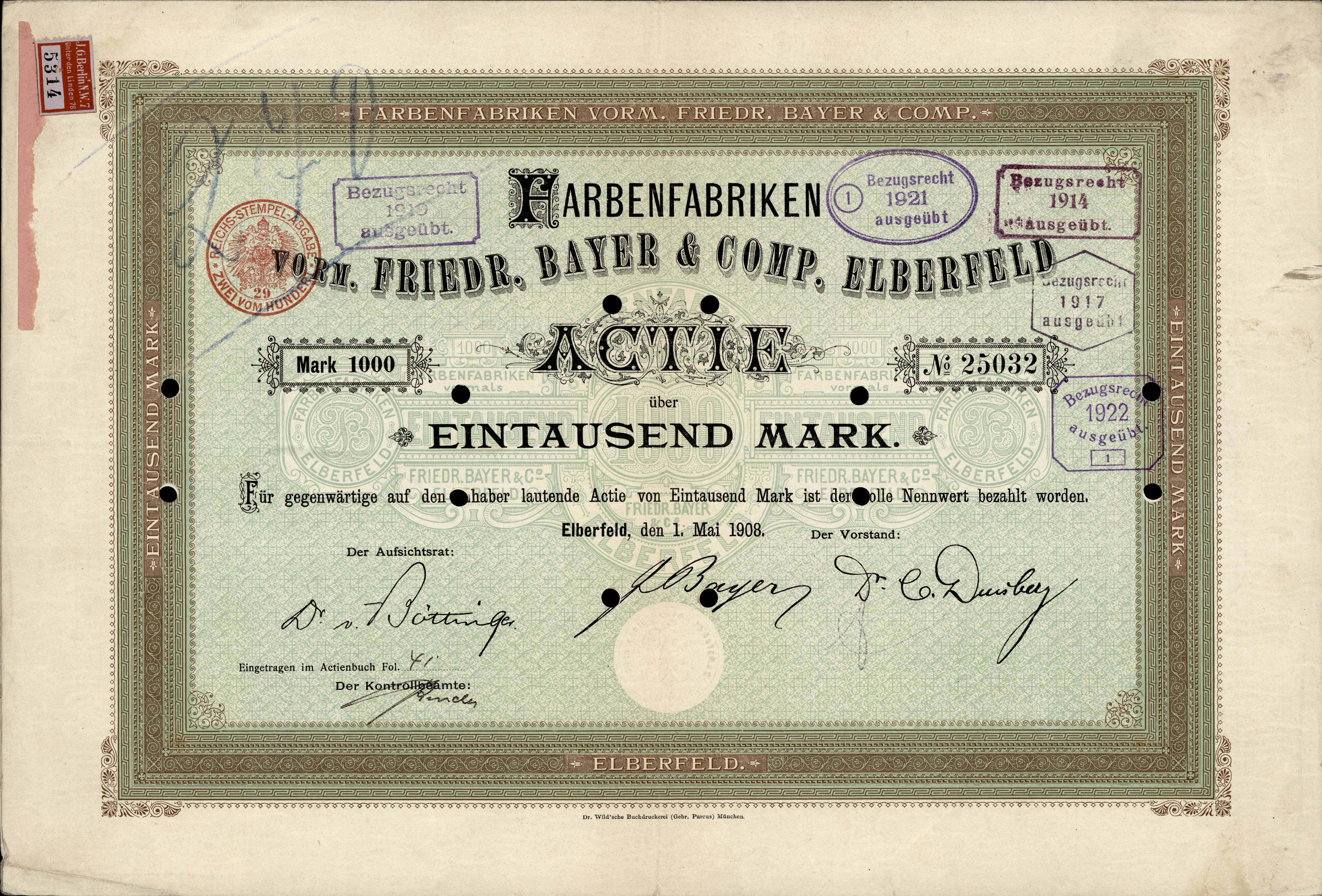
Share of Farbenfabriken vorm. Friedr. Bayer & Comp in Elberfeld, issued 1 May 1908

Bayer AG was founded as a dyestuffs factory in 1863 in Barmen (later part of Wuppertal), Germany, by Friedrich Bayer and his partner, Johann Friedrich Weskott, a master dyer. Bayer was responsible for the commercial tasks. Fuchsine and aniline became the company's most important products.

The headquarters and most production facilities moved from Barmen to a larger area in Elberfeld in 1866. Friedrich Bayer (1851–1920), the son of the company's founder, was a chemist and joined the company in 1873. After the death of his father in 1880, the company became a joint-stock company, Farbenfabriken vorm. Friedr. Bayer & Co, also known as Elberfelder Farbenfabriken.

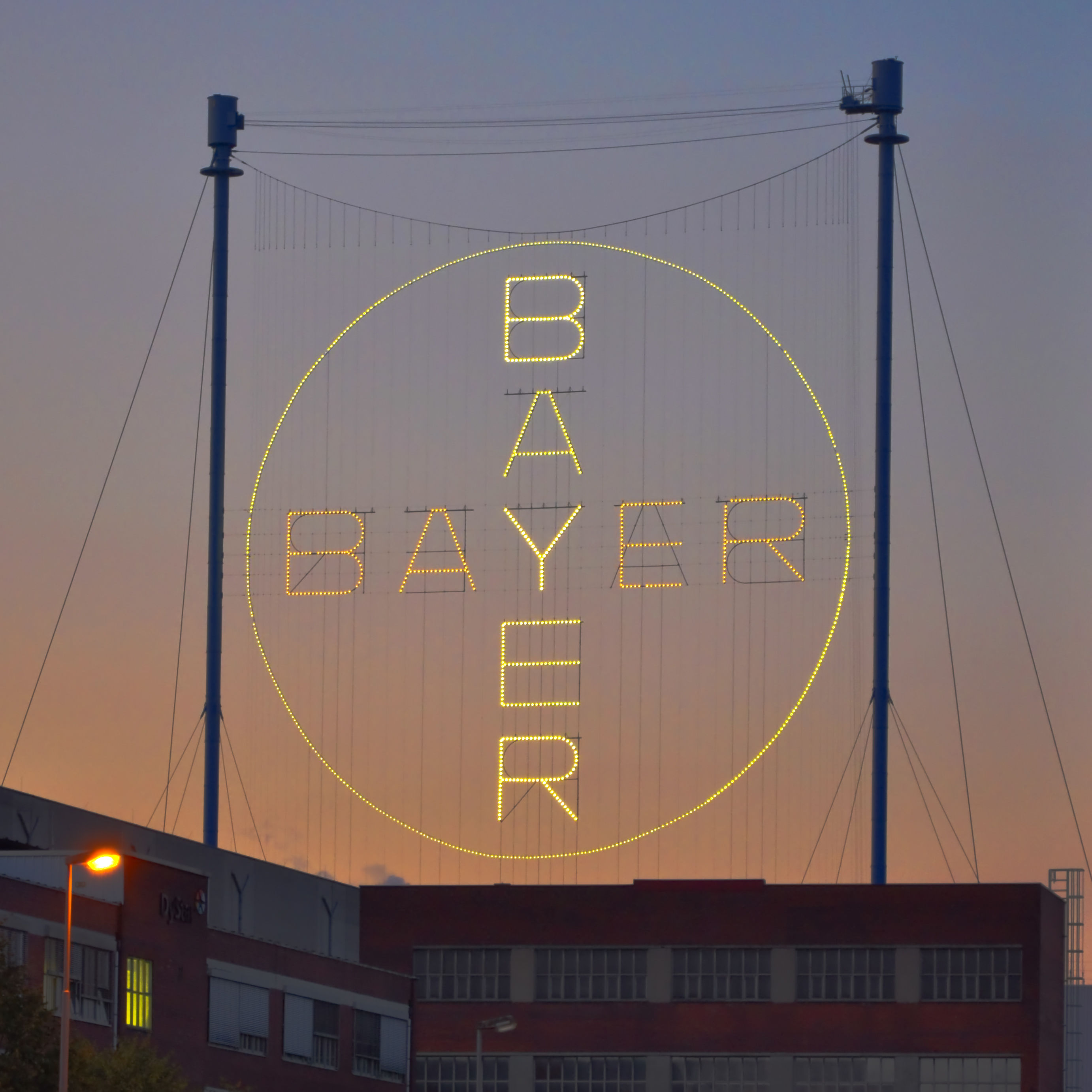
Bayer cross, Leverkusen

A further expansion in Elberfeld was impossible, so the company moved to the village Wiesdorf at Rhein and settled in the area of the alizarin producer Leverkus and Sons. A new city, Leverkusen, was founded there in 1930 and became home to Bayer AG's headquarters. The company's corporate logo, the Bayer cross, was introduced in 1904, consisting of the word BAYER written vertically and horizontally, sharing the Y and enclosed in a circle. An illuminated version of the logo is a landmark in Leverkusen.

=== Aspirin ===
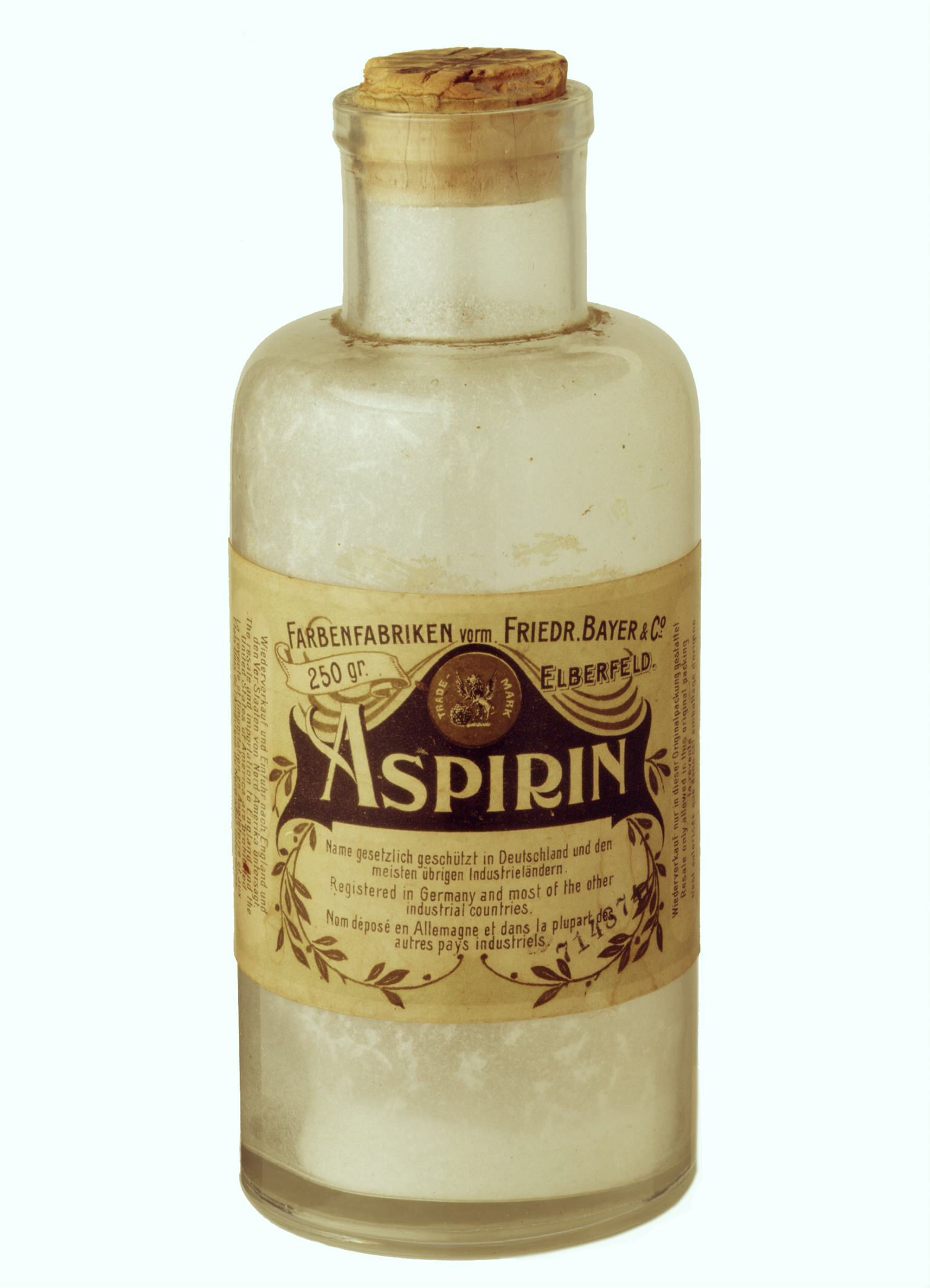
Bottle of Bayer aspirin, 1899

Bayer's first major product was acetylsalicylic acid—first described by French chemist Charles Frederic Gerhardt in 1853—a modification of salicylic acid or salicin, a folk remedy found in the bark of the willow plant. By 1899, Bayer's trademark Aspirin was registered worldwide for Bayer's brand of acetylsalicylic acid, but it lost its trademark status in the United States, France and the United Kingdom after the confiscation of Bayer's US assets and trademarks during World War I by the United States, and because of the subsequent widespread usage of the word.

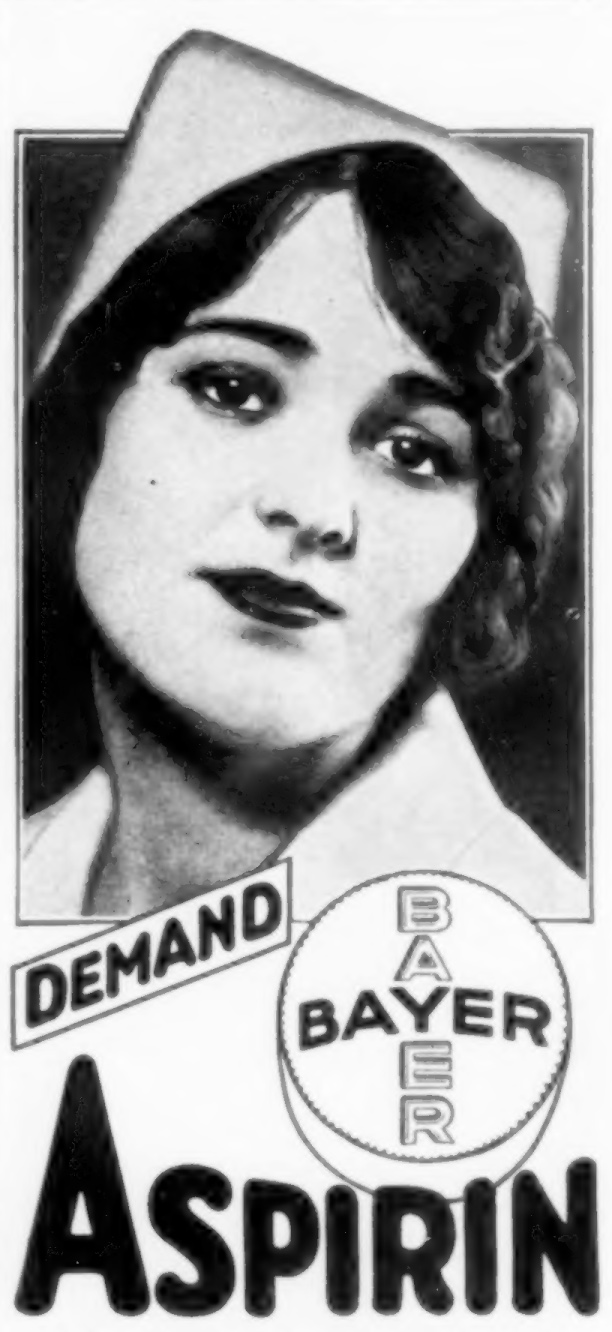
Advert for Bayer Aspirin in Life magazine, 1927

The term aspirin continued to be used in the US, UK and France for all brands of the drug, but it is still a registered trademark of Bayer in over 80 countries, including Canada, Mexico, Germany and Switzerland. As of 2011, approximately 40,000 tons of aspirin were produced each year and 10–20 billion tablets consumed in the United States alone for prevention of cardiovascular events. It is on the WHO Model List of Essential Medicines, the most important medications needed in a basic health system.

There is an unresolved controversy over the roles played by Bayer scientists in the development of aspirin. Arthur Eichengrün, a Bayer chemist who, in 1944, was imprisoned at Theresienstadt concentration camp; had asserted that he was the first to discover an aspirin formulation that did not have the unpleasant side effects of nausea and gastric pain. He also said he had invented the name aspirin and was the first person to use the new formulation to test its safety and efficacy. Bayer contends that aspirin was discovered by an Aryan research assistant, Felix Hoffmann, to help his father, who had arthritis. Various sources support the conflicting claims. Most mainstream historians attribute the invention of aspirin to Hoffmann and/or Eichengrün.

=== Heroin ===
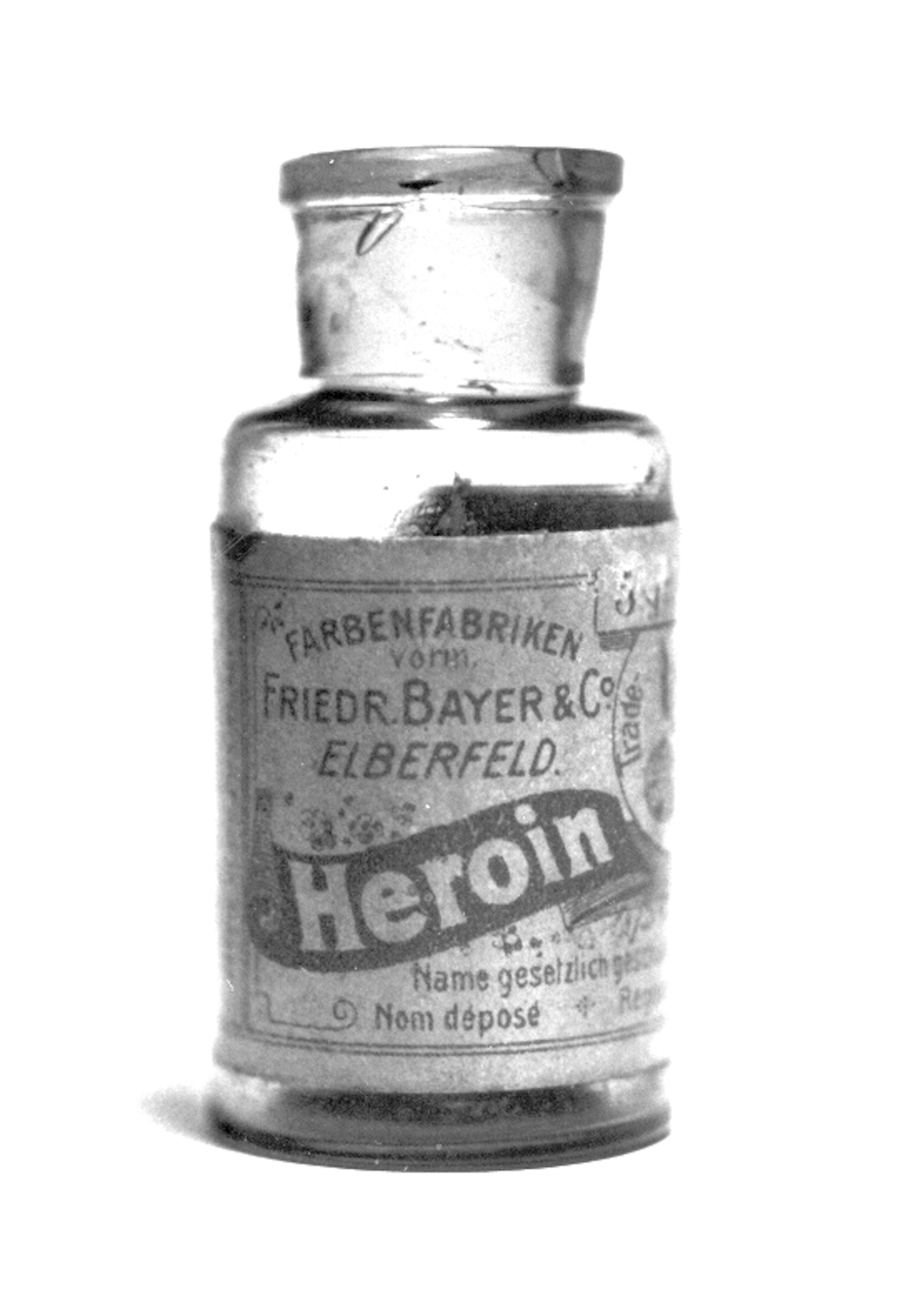
Bayer Heroin bottle

Heroin (diacetylmorphine), now illegal as an addictive drug, was introduced as a non-addictive substitute for morphine, and trademarked and marketed by Bayer from 1898 to 1910 as a cough suppressant and over-the-counter treatment for other common ailments, including pneumonia and tuberculosis. While Bayer scientists were not the first to make heroin, the company did lead the way in commercializing it. Heroin was a Bayer trademark until after World War I. Bayer's director of pharmacology did not want the drug to have "too complicated a name" so Bayer settled on heroisch, the German word for heroic.

=== Phenobarbital ===
In 1903, Bayer licensed the patent for the hypnotic drug diethylbarbituric acid from its inventors Emil Fischer and Joseph von Mering. It was marketed under the trade name Veronal as a sleep aid beginning in 1904. Systematic investigations of the effect of structural changes on potency and duration of action at Bayer led to the discovery of phenobarbital in 1911 and the discovery of its potent anti-epileptic activity in 1912. Phenobarbital was among the most widely used drugs for the treatment of epilepsy through the 1970s, and as of 2014 it remains on the World Health Organization's list of essential medications.

=== World War I ===
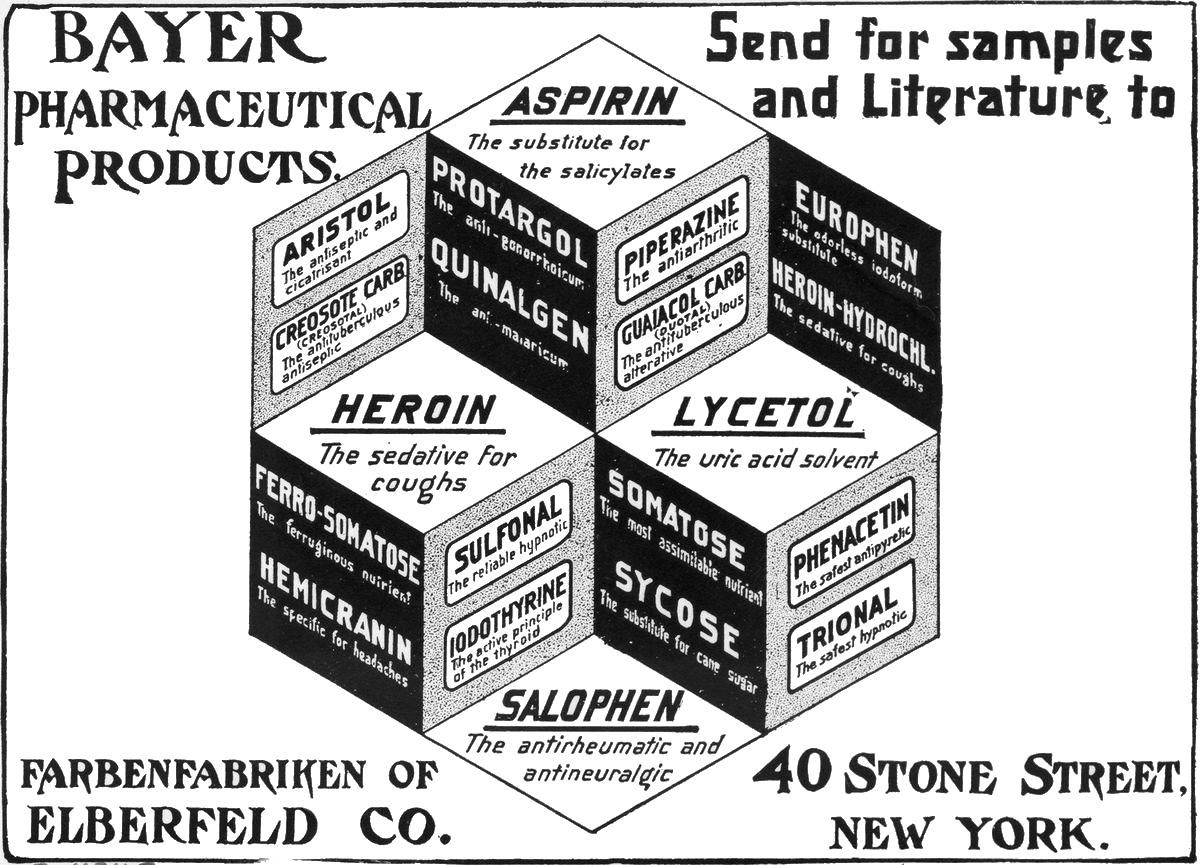
Bayer advertisement, 1911

During World War I (1914–1918), Bayer's assets, including the rights to its name and trademarks, were confiscated in the United States, Canada and several other countries. In the United States and Canada, Bayer's assets and trademarks, including the well-known Bayer cross, were acquired by Sterling Drug, a predecessor of Sterling Winthrop and were not reclaimed until 1994.

Throughout the war, Bayer was involved in production and development of various chemical weapons. In 1914, Bayer manufactured dianisidine chlorosulfate for use in 105 mm artillery shell, intended as a lung irritant against British forces.

In 1916, Bayer scientists discovered suramin, an anti-parasite drug that is still sold by Bayer under the brand name Germanin. The formula of suramin was kept secret by Bayer for commercial reasons, but it was elucidated and published in 1924 by Ernest Fourneau and his team at the Pasteur Institute. It is on the World Health Organization's List of Essential Medicines.

=== IG Farben ===
In 1925, Bayer became part of IG Farben, a German conglomerate formed from the merger of six chemical companies: BASF, Bayer, Hoechst (including Cassella and Kalle & Co.), Agfa, Chemische Fabrik Griesheim-Elektron, and Chemische Fabrik vorm. Weiler Ter Meer. In the 1930s, Gerhard Domagk, director of Bayer's Institute of Pathology and Bacteriology, working with chemists Fritz Mietzsch and Joseph Klarer, discovered prontosil, the first commercially available antibacterial drug. The discovery and development of this first sulfonamide drug opened a new era in medicine. Domagk won the Nobel Prize in Physiology or Medicine in 1939 "for the discovery of the antibacterial effects of prontosil". He was forced by the Nazi Party to relinquish the reward; German citizens had been forbidden from accepting Nobel prizes since the Nobel committee had awarded the 1935 Nobel Peace Prize to a German pacifist, Carl von Ossietzky.

=== World War II and the Holocaust ===
IG Farben, Bayer's parent company, used slave labour in factories it built in Nazi concentration camps, most notably in the Monowitz concentration camp (known as Auschwitz III), part of the Auschwitz camp complex in German-occupied Poland. By 1943, almost half of IG Farben's 330,000-strong workforce consisted of slave labour or conscripts, including 30,000 Auschwitz prisoners.

Helmuth Vetter, an Auschwitz camp physician, SS captain and employee of the Bayer group within IG Farben conducted medical experiments on inmates at Auschwitz and at the Mauthausen concentration camp. In one study of an anaesthetic, the company paid RM 170 per person for the use of 150 female inmates of Auschwitz. A Bayer employee wrote to Rudolf Höss, the Auschwitz commandant: "The transport of 150 women arrived in good condition. However, we were unable to obtain conclusive results because they died during the experiments. We would kindly request that you send us another group of women to the same number and at the same price."

After the war, the Allied Control Council seized IG Farben for "knowingly and prominently... building up and maintaining German war potential". It was split into its six constituent companies in 1951, then split again into three: BASF, Bayer and Hoechst. Bayer was at that point known as Farbenfabriken Bayer AG; it changed its name to Bayer AG in 1972. After the war, some employees of Bayer appeared in the IG Farben Trial, one of the Nuremberg Subsequent Tribunals under US jurisdiction. Among them was Fritz ter Meer, who helped to plan the Monowitz camp (Auschwitz III) and IG Farben's Buna Werke factory at Auschwitz, where medical experimentation had been conducted and where 25,000 forced laborers were deployed. Ter Meer was sentenced to seven years, but was released in 1950. Despite being a convicted Nazi war criminal, Ter Meer was elected as chairman of Bayer AG's supervisory board in 1956, a position he retained until 1964.

Helge Wehmeier, then CEO of Bayer, offered a public apology in 1995 to Elie Wiesel for the company's actions during World War II (1939–1945) and the Holocaust.

== Products ==
=== Overview ===
In 1953, Bayer brought the first neuroleptic (chlorpromazine) onto the German market. In the 1960s, Bayer introduced a pregnancy test, Primodos, that consisted of two pills that contained norethisterone (as acetate) and ethinylestradiol. It detected pregnancy by inducing menstruation in women who were not pregnant; the presence or absence of menstrual bleeding was then used to determine whether the user was pregnant. The test became the subject of controversy when it was blamed for birth defects, and it was withdrawn from the market in the mid-1970s. Litigation in the 1980s ended inconclusively. A review of the matter by the Medicines and Healthcare products Regulatory Agency in 2014 assessed the studies performed to date and found the evidence for adverse effects to be inconclusive.

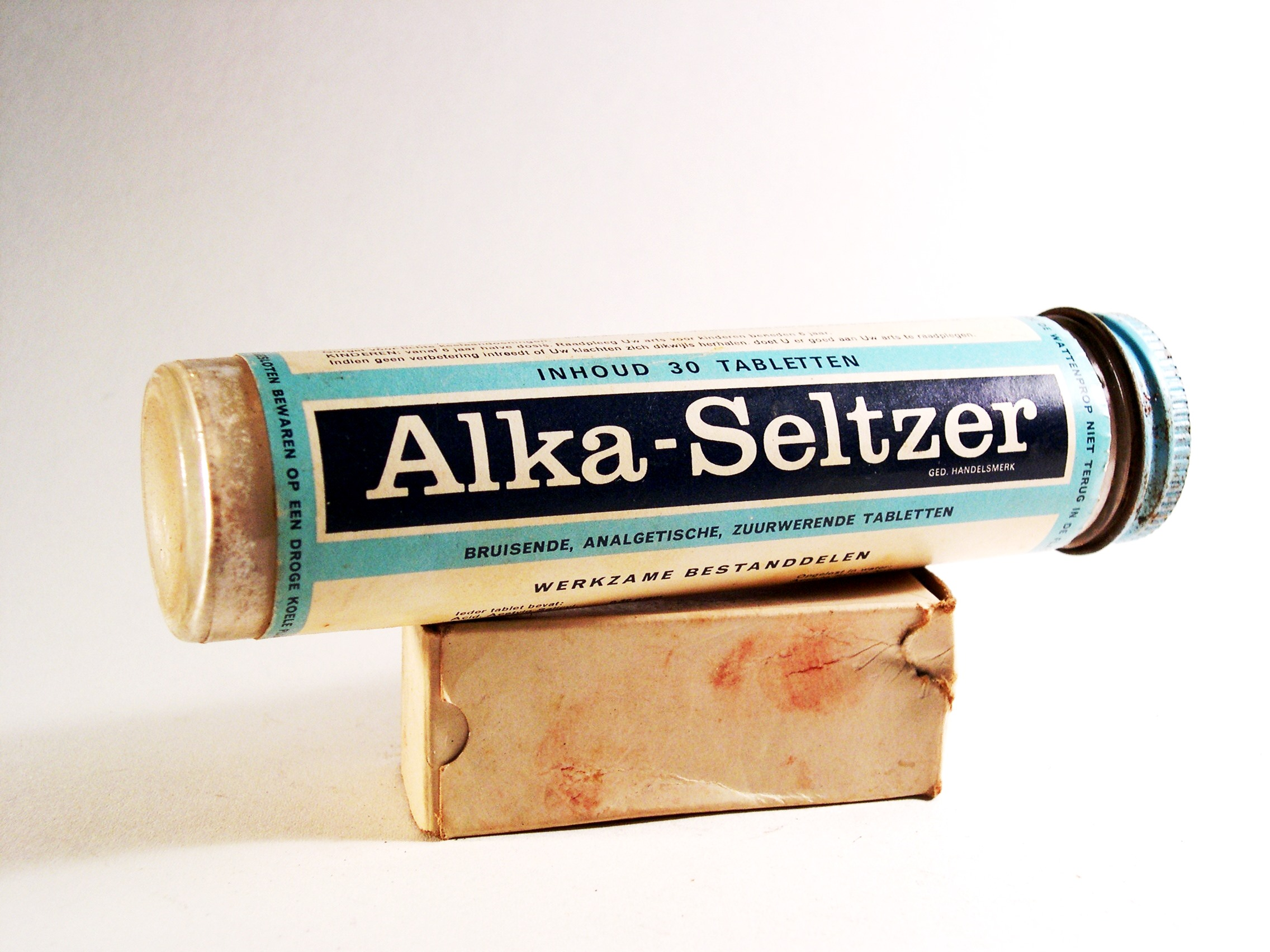
Bayer has owned Alka-Seltzer since 1978.

In 1978, Bayer purchased Miles Laboratories and its subsidiaries Miles Canada and Cutter Laboratories, including product lines Alka-Seltzer, Flintstones Chewable Vitamins and One-A-Day vitamins, as well as Cutter insect repellent, and Cutter's Factor VIII business.

Factor VIII, a clotting agent used to treat hemophilia, was produced, at the time, by processing donated blood. In the early days of the AIDS epidemic, people with hemophilia were found to have higher rates of AIDS, and by 1983 the CDC had identified contaminated blood products as a source of infection. According to the New York Times, this was "one of the worst drug-related medical disasters in history". Companies, including Bayer, developed new ways to treat donated blood with heat to decontaminate it, and these new products were introduced early in 1984. In 1997, Bayer and the other three makers of such blood products agreed to pay $660 million to settle cases on behalf of more than 6,000 hemophiliacs infected in the United States. But in 2003, documents emerged showing that Cutter had continued to sell unheated blood products in markets outside the US until 1985, including in Malaysia, Singapore, Indonesia, Japan and Argentina, to offload a product it was unable to sell in Europe and the US; it also continued manufacturing the unheated product for several months. Bayer said it did this because some countries were doubtful about the efficacy of the new product.

Bayer has been involved in other controversies regarding its drug products. In the late 1990s it introduced a statin drug, Baycol (cerivastatin), but after 52 deaths were attributed to it, Bayer discontinued it in 2001. The side effect was rhabdomyolysis, causing kidney failure, which occurred with a tenfold greater frequency in patients treated with Baycol in comparison to those prescribed alternate medications of the statin class. Trasylol (aprotinin), used to control bleeding during major surgery, was withdrawn from the market worldwide in 2007 when reports of increased mortality emerged; it was later re-introduced in Europe but not in the US.

=== Top-selling pharmaceutical products ===
In 2014, pharmaceutical products contributed €12.05 billion of Bayer's €40.15 billion in gross revenue. In 2019, identified "key growth" products were Xarelto (rivaroxaban), Eylea (aflibercept), Stivarga (regorafenib), Xofigo (radium-223), and Adempas (riociguat). Top-selling products as of 2014 included:

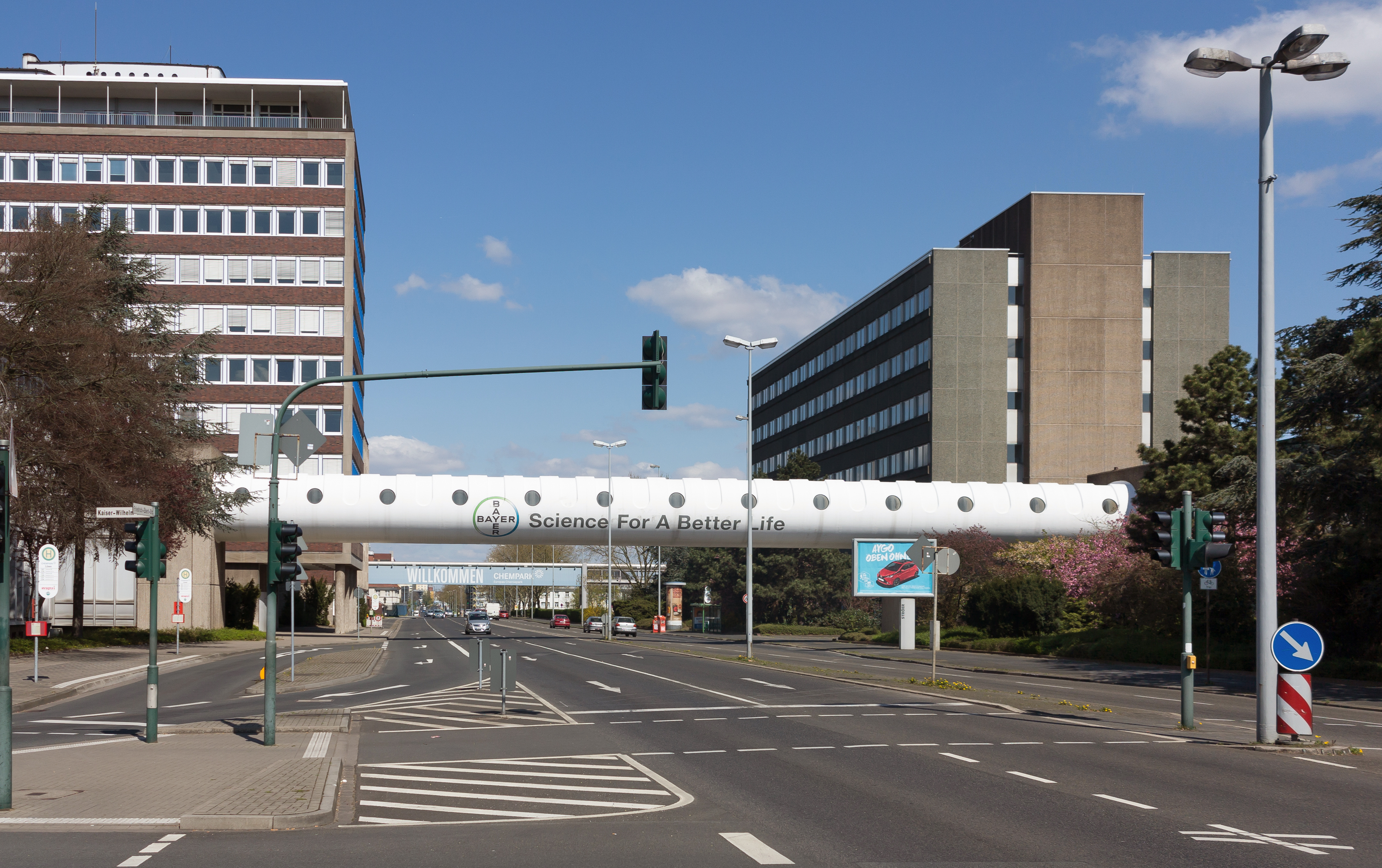
Bayer facility in Leverkusen

- Kogenate (recombinant clotting factor VIII). Kogenate is a recombinant version of clotting factor VIII, the absence or deficiency of which causes the abnormal bleeding associated with haemophilia type A. Kogenate is one of several commercially available Factor VIII products having equivalent efficacy.
- Xarelto (rivaroxaban) is a small molecule inhibitor of Factor Xa, a key enzyme involved in blood coagulation. In the United States, the FDA has approved rivaroxaban for the prevention of stroke in people with atrial fibrillation, for the treatment of deep vein thrombosis and pulmonary embolism, and for the prevention of deep vein thrombosis in people undergoing hip surgery. Rivaroxaban competes with other newer generation anticoagulants such as edoxaban, apixaban, and dabigatran as well as with the generic anticoagulant warfarin. It has similar efficacy to warfarin and is associated with a lower risk of intracranial bleeding, but unlike warfarin there is no established protocol for rapidly reversing its effects in the event of uncontrolled bleeding or the need for emergency surgery.
- Betaseron (interferon beta-1b) is an injectable form of the protein interferon beta used to prevent relapses in the relapsing remitting form of multiple sclerosis. Betaseron competes with other injectable forms of interferon beta, glatiramer acetate, and a variety of newer multiple sclerosis drugs, some of which can be taken orally (Dimethyl fumarate, teriflunomide, others).
- Yasmin / Yaz birth control pills are part of a group of birth control pill products based on the progestin drospirenone. Yaz is approved in the United States for the prevention of pregnancy, to treat symptoms of premenstrual dysphoric disorder in women who choose an oral contraceptive for contraception, and to treat moderate acne in women at least 14 years of age who choose an oral contraceptive for contraception. The FDA conducted a safety review regarding the potential of Yaz and other drospirenone-containing products to increase the risk of blood clots; Yaz and Yasmin were associated with the deaths of 23 women in Canada, leading Health Canada to issue a warning in 2011. Although conflicting results were obtained in different studies, the FDA added a warning to the label in 2012 that Yaz and related products may be associated with an increased risk of clotting relative to other birth control pill products. Subsequently, a meta analysis suggested that birth control pills of the class Yasmin belongs to raise the risk of blood clots to a greater extent than some other classes of birth control pills.
- Nexavar (sorafenib) is a kinase inhibitor used in the treatment of liver cancer (hepatocellular carcinoma), kidney cancer (renal cell carcinoma), and certain types of thyroid cancer.
- Trasylol (Aprotinin) Trasylol is a trypsin inhibitor used to control bleeding during major surgery. In a 2006 meeting called by the FDA to review the drug's safety, Bayer scientists failed to reveal the results of an ongoing large study suggesting that Trasylol may increase the risks of death and stroke. According to a FDA official who preferred to remain anonymous, the FDA learned of the study only through information provided to the FDA by a whistleblowing scientist who was involved in it. The study concluded Trasylol carried greater risks of death, serious kidney damage, congestive heart failure and strokes. On 15 December of the same year, the FDA restricted the use of Trasylol, and in November 2007, they requested that the company suspend marketing. In 2011, Health Canada lifted its suspension of Trasylol for its originally approved indication of limiting bleeding in coronary bypass surgery, citing flaws in the design of the studies that led to its suspension. This decision was controversial. In 2013, the European Medicines Agency lifted its suspension of the Trasylol marketing authorization for selected patients undergoing cardiac bypass surgery, citing a favorable risk-benefit ratio.
- Cipro (ciprofloxacin) Ciprofloxacin was approved by the US Food and Drug Administration (FDA) in 1987. Ciprofloxacin is the most widely used of the second-generation quinolone antibiotics that came into clinical use in the late 1980s and early 1990s. In 2010, over 20 million outpatient prescriptions were written for ciprofloxacin, making it the 35th-most commonly prescribed drug, and the 5th-most commonly prescribed antibacterial, in the US.
- Rennie antacid tablets, one of the biggest selling branded over-the-counter medications sold in Great Britain, with sales of £29.8 million.

=== Agricultural ===
Bayer produces various fungicides, herbicides, insecticides, and some crop varieties.

- Fungicides are primarily marketed for cereal crops, fresh produce, fungal with bacteria-based pesticides, and control of mildew and rust diseases. Nativo products are a mixture of trifloxystrobin tebuconazole. XPro products are a mix of bixafen and prothioconazole, while Luna contains fluopyram and pyrimethanil.
- Herbicides are marketed primarily for field crops and orchards. Liberty brands containing glufosinate (a.k.a. Liberty or Basta) are used for general weed control. Capreno containing a mixture of thiencarbazone-methyl and tembotrione is used for grass and broad-leaf control.
- Insecticides are marketed according to specific crop and insect pest type. Foliar insecticides include Belt containing flubendiamide, which is marketed against Lepidopteran pests, and Movento containing spirotetramat, which is marketed against sucking insects. Neonicotinoids such as clothianidin and imidacloprid are used as systemic seed treatments products such as Poncho and Gaucho. In 2008, neonicotinoids came under increasing scrutiny over their environmental impacts starting in Germany. Neonicotinoid use has been linked in a range of studies to adverse ecological effects, including honey-bee colony collapse disorder (CCD) and loss of birds due to a reduction in insect populations. In 2013, the European Union and a few non EU countries restricted the use of certain neonicotinoids. Parathion was discovered by scientists at IG Farben in the 1940s as a cholinesterase inhibitor insecticide. Propoxur is a carbamate insecticide that was introduced by Bayer in 1959.

== Acquisitions ==
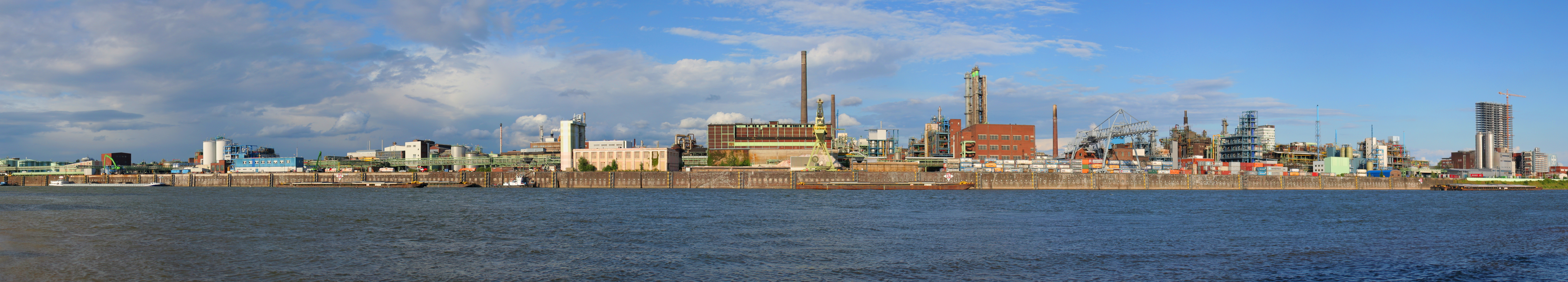
Bayer factory in Leverkusen, Germany, 2009

=== Overview ===
In 1994, Bayer AG purchased Sterling Winthrop's over-the-counter (OTC) drug business from SmithKline Beecham and merged it with Miles Laboratories, thereby reclaiming the U.S. and Canadian trademark rights to "Bayer" and the Bayer cross, as well as the ownership of the Aspirin trademark in Canada.

In 2004, Bayer HealthCare acquired the over-the-counter pharmaceutical division of Roche. In March 2008, Bayer HealthCare announced an agreement to acquire the portfolio and OTC division of privately owned Sagmel, Inc., a US-based company that markets OTC medications in most of the Commonwealth of Independent States countries such as Russia, Ukraine, Kazakhstan, Belarus, and others.

On 28 August 2008, an explosion occurred at the Bayer CropScience facility at Institute, West Virginia, United States. A runaway reaction ruptured a tank and the resulting explosion killed two employees. The ruptured tank was close to a methyl isocyanate tank which was undamaged by the explosion.

=== Acquisition of Schering ===
In March 2006, Merck KGaA announced a €14.6 billion bid for Schering AG, founded in 1851. By 2006, Schering had annual gross revenue of around €5 billion and employed about 26,000 people in 140 subsidiaries worldwide. Bayer responded with a white knight bid and in July acquired the majority of shares of Schering for €14.6 billion, and in 2007, Bayer took over Schering AG and formed Bayer Schering Pharma. The acquisition of Schering was the largest take-over in Bayer's history, and as of 2015, was one of the ten biggest pharma mergers of all time.

=== Other acquisitions ===
In November 2010, Bayer AG signed an agreement to buy Auckland-based animal health company Bomac Group. Bayer partnered on the development of the radiotherapeutic Xofigo with Algeta, and in 2014, moved to acquire the company for about $2.9 billion. In 2014, Bayer agreed to buy Merck's consumer health business for $14.2 billion which would provide Bayer control with brands such as Claritin, Coppertone and Dr. Scholl's. Bayer would attain second place globally in nonprescription drugs. In June 2015, Bayer agreed to sell its diabetic care business to Panasonic Healthcare Holdings for a fee of $1.02 billion.

In August 2019, the business acquired the ≈60% of BlueRock Therapeutics it didn't already own for up to $600 million.

In August 2020, Bayer announced it had acquired KaNDy Therapeutics Ltd, helping to boost its female healthcare business, for $425 million. In October, Bayer agreed to acquire Asklepios BioPharmaceuticals for $2 billion upfront.

In June 2021, the company announced it acquired Noria Therapeutics Inc. and PSMA Therapeutics Inc. gaining rights to a number of cancer-based investigational compounds based on actinium-225.

In May 2026, Bayer announced its plans to buy Perfuse Therapeutics, a biopharmaceutical company, for up to $2.45 billion—including a $300 million upfront payment.

Bayer owns the Bundesliga football club Bayer Leverkusen.

=== Spin off of Covestro ===
In September 2015, Bayer spun out its $12.3 billion materials science division into a separate, publicly traded company called Covestro in which it retained about a 70% interest. Bayer spun out the division because it had relatively low profit margins compared to its life science divisions (10.2%, compared with 24.9% for the agriculture business and 27.5% for healthcare) and because the business required high levels of investment to maintain its growth, and to more clearly focus its efforts and identity in the life sciences. Covestro shares were first offered on the Frankfurt Stock Exchange in October 2015. Effective January 2016 following the spinout of Covestro, Bayer rebranded itself as a life sciences company, and restructured into three divisions and one business unit: Pharmaceuticals, Consumer Health, Crop Science, and Animal Health.

=== Acquisition of Monsanto ===
In May 2016, Bayer offered to buy U.S. biotechnology company Monsanto for $62 billion. Shortly after Bayer's offer, Monsanto rejected the acquisition bid, seeking a higher price. In September 2016, Monsanto agreed to a $66 billion offer by Bayer. In order to receive regulatory approval, Bayer agreed to divest a significant amount of its current agricultural assets to BASF in a series of deals. On 21 March 2018 the deal was approved by the European Union, and it was approved in the United States on 20 May 2018. The sale closed on 7 June 2018. The Monsanto brand was discontinued; its products are now marketed under the Bayer name. On 16 September 2019, under the approval of National Company Law Tribunal, Bayer completed the merger of Monsanto India.

Bayer's Monsanto acquisition is the biggest acquisition by a German company to date. However, owing to ongoing litigation concerning the Monsanto's herbicide Roundup and the massive financial and reputational setbacks it has caused Bayer, the deal is considered one of the worst corporate mergers in history. By 2023, Bayer's market value had declined by over 60% since its 2016 merger, leaving the company's overall worth at less than half of what it paid to acquire Monsanto.

=== Acquisition history ===
Bayer acquisitions
- Bayer
  - Miles Laboratories (Acq 1978)
    - Miles Canada
  - Cutter Laboratories
  - Hollister-Stier
  - Corn King Company
  - Plastron Specialties
  - Pacific Plastics Company
  - Olympic Plastics Company
  - Ashe-Lockhart Inc
  - Haver-Glover Laboratories
  - Sterling Winthrop (Acq 1994, over the counter division)
  - Roche Pharmaceuticals (Acq 2004, over the counter division)
  - Schering AG (Acq 2006, formed Bayer Schering Pharma AG, renamed Bayer HealthCare Pharmaceuticals in 2011)
  - Jenapharm
  - Bomac Group (Acq 2010)
  - Algeta (Acq 2014)
  - Merck & Co (Acq 2014, Consumer Health Business)
  - Monsanto (Spun off from Pharmacia & Upjohn 2000)
    - Emergent Genetics (Acq 2005)
    - Seminis (Acq 2005)
    - Icoria, Inc (Acq 2005)
    - Delta & Pine Land Company (Acq 2007)
    - De Ruiter Seeds (Acq 2008)
    - Agroeste Sementes (Acq 2008)
    - Aly Participacoes Ltda (Acq 2008)
      - CanaVialis S.A.
      - Alellyx S.A.
    - Divergence, Inc (Acq 2011)
    - Beeologics (Acq 2011)
    - Precision Planting Inc (Acq 2012)
    - Climate Corp (Acq 2013)
      - 640 Labs (Acq 2014)
    - Agradis, Inc (Acq 2013)
    - Rosetta Green Ltd (Acq 2013)
    - American Seeds, Inc
      - Channel Bio Corp (Acq 2004)
      - Stone Seeds (Acq 2005)
      - Trelay Seeds (Acq 2005)
      - Stewart Seeds (Acq 2005)
      - Fontanelle Hybrids (Acq 2005)
      - Specialty Hybrids (Acq 2005)
      - NC+ Hybrids, Inc (Acq 2005)
      - Diener Seeds (seed marketing and sales division, acq 2006)
      - Sieben Hybrids (Acq 2006)
      - Kruger Seed Company (Acq 2006)
      - Trisler Seed Farms (Acq 2006)
      - Campbell Seed ((seed marketing and sales business, acq 2006))
      - Gold Country Seed, Inc (Acq 2006)
      - Heritage Seeds (Acq 2013)
    - International Seed Group, Inc
      - Poloni Semences (Acq 2007)
      - Charentais Melon Breeding Company (Acq 2007)
  - BlueRock Therapeutics (Acq 2019)
  - KaNDy Therapeutics Ltd (Acq 2020)
  - Asklepios BioPharmaceutical (Acq 2020)
  - Noria Therapeutics Inc. (Acq 2021)
  - PSMA Therapeutics Inc. (Acq 2021)
  - Vividion Therapeutics (Acq 2021)

== Corporate structure ==
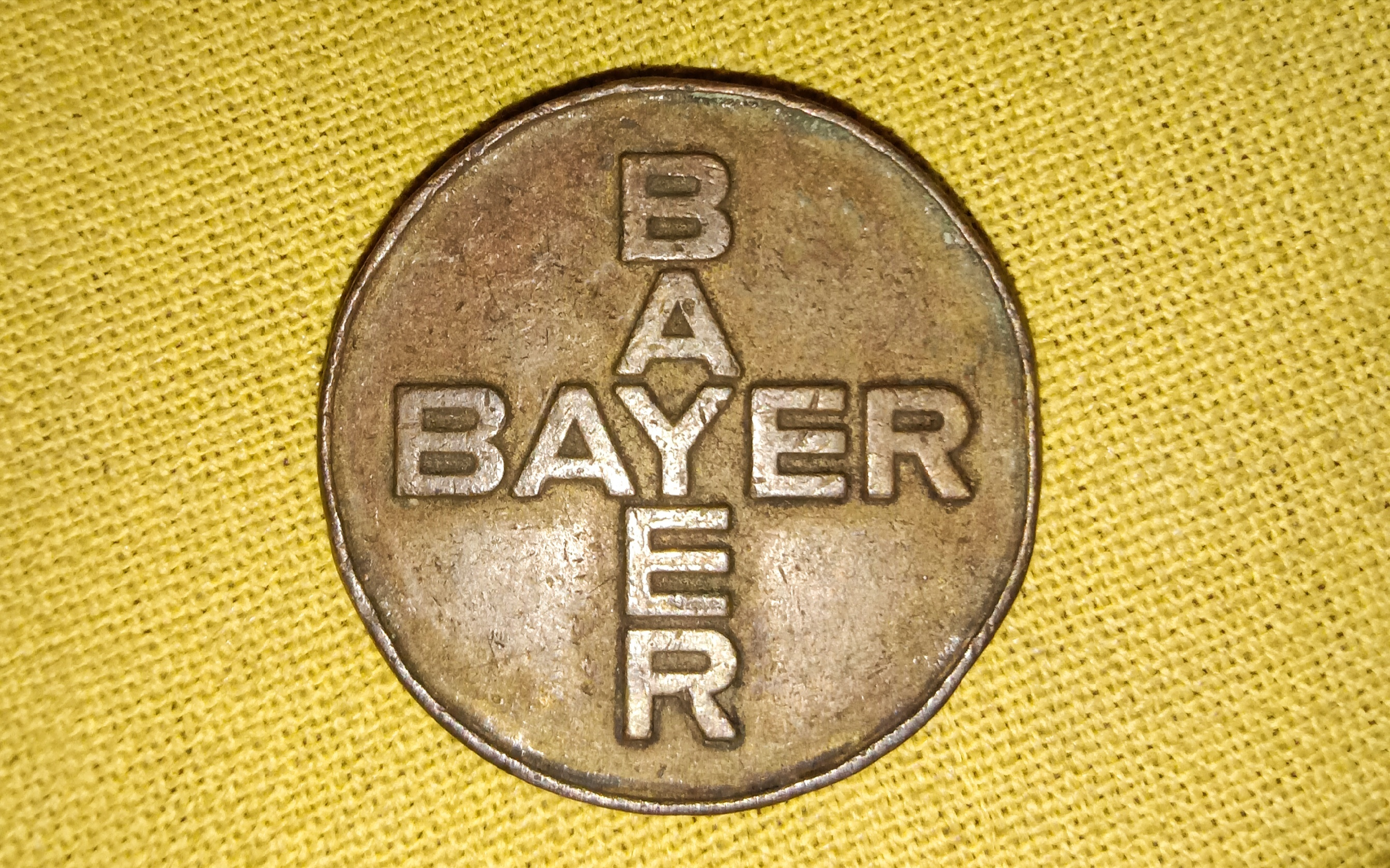
Undated Bayer copper token

Sales by business unit (2023)
| Business unit | share |
|---|---|
| Crop Science | 48.8% |
| Pharmaceuticals | 38.0% |
| Consumer Health | 12.7% |
| Other | 0.5% |

In 2003, to separate operational and strategic managements, Bayer AG was reorganized into a holding company. The group's core businesses were transformed into limited companies, each controlled by Bayer AG. These companies were: Bayer CropScience AG; Bayer HealthCare AG; Bayer MaterialScience AG and Bayer Chemicals AG, and the three service limited companies Bayer Technology Services GmbH, Bayer Business Services GmbH and Bayer Industry Services GmbH & Co. OHG. In 2016, the company began a second restructuring with the aim of allowing it to transition to a life sciences based company. By divesting its Chemicals division in 2004 and with the aim of off-loading its Materials division by mid-2016, Bayer will be left with the four core units, as depicted below.

| Bayer AG | | | Divested business units |
|---|---|---|---|
| Bayer Pharmaceuticals; Head of Division: Stefan Oelrich | Bayer Consumer Health; Head of Division: Julio Triana | Bayer Crop Science; Head of Division: Rodrigo Santos | Lanxess (Bayer Chemicals AG); Diagnostics Division; Diabetes Devices Division; Covestro (Bayer MaterialScience); Bayer Animal Health (sold to Elanco) |

=== Bayer CropScience ===
Bayer CropScience has products in crop protection (i.e. pesticides), nonagricultural pest control, and seeds and plant biotechnology. In addition to conventional agrochemical business, it is involved in genetic engineering of food. In 2002, Bayer AG acquired Aventis (now part of Sanofi) CropScience and fused it with its own agrochemicals division (Bayer Pflanzenschutz or "Crop Protection") to form Bayer CropScience; the Belgian biotech company Plant Genetic Systems became part of Bayer through the Aventis acquisition. Also in 2002, Bayer AG acquired the Dutch seed company Nunhems, which at the time was one of the world's top five seed companies. In 2006, the U.S. Department of Agriculture announced that Bayer CropScience's LibertyLink genetically modified rice had contaminated the U.S. rice supply. Shortly after the public learned of the contamination, the E.U. banned imports of U.S. long-grain rice and the futures price plunged. In April 2010, a Lonoke County, Arkansas jury awarded a dozen farmers $48 million. The case was appealed to the Arkansas Supreme Court, which affirmed the judgement. On 1 July 2011, Bayer CropScience agreed to a global settlement for up to $750 million. In September 2014, the firm announced plans to invest $1 billion in the United States between 2013 and 2016. A Bayer spokesperson said that the largest investments will be made to expand the production of its herbicide Liberty. Liberty is an alternative to Monsanto's product, Roundup, which are both used to kill weeds. In 2016, as part of the wholesale corporate restructuring, Bayer CropScience became one of the three major divisions of Bayer AG, reporting directly to the head of the division, Liam Condon. Under the terms of the merger, Bayer promised to maintain Monsanto's more than 9,000 U.S. jobs and add 3,000 new U.S. high-tech positions. The prospective merger parties said at the time the combined agriculture business planned to spend $16 billion on research and development over the next six years and at least $8 billion on research and development in the United States. The global headquarters of Bayer CropScience is located in St. Louis, Missouri, United States.

Bayer CropScience Limited is the Indian subsidiary of Bayer AG. It is listed on the Indian stock exchanges; the Bombay Stock Exchange and National Stock Exchange of India, and has a market capitalization of $2 billion. Bayer BioScience, headquartered in Hyderabad, India, has about 400 employees, and has research, production, and an extensive sales network spread across India.

=== Bayer Consumer Health ===
Before the 2016 restructuring, Bayer HealthCare comprised a further four subdivisions: Bayer Schering Pharma, Bayer Consumer Care, Bayer Animal Health and Bayer Medical Care. As part of the corporate restructuring, Animal Health was moved into its own business unit, leaving the division with the following categories; Allergy, Analgesics, Cardiovascular Risk Prevention, Cough & Cold, Dermatology, Foot Care, Gastrointestinals, Nutritionals and Sun Care.

Bayer Consumer Care manages Bayer's OTC medicines portfolio. Key products include analgesics such as Bayer Aspirin and Aleve, food supplements Redoxon and Berocca, and skincare products Bepanthen and Bepanthol. Women's healthcare is an example of a General Medicine business unit. Bayer Pharma produces the birth control pills Yaz and Yasmin. Both pills use a newer type of progestin hormone called drospirenone in combination with estrogen. Yaz is advertised as a treatment for premenstrual dysphoric disorder (PMDD) and moderate acne. Other key products include the cancer drug Nexavar, the multiple sclerosis drug betaferon/betaseron and the blood-clotting drug, Kogenate. In May 2014, it was announced that Bayer would buy Merck & Co's consumer health care unit for $14.2 billion. Bayer also controls Dihon Pharmaceutical Group Co., Ltd in China.

=== Bayer Pharmaceuticals ===
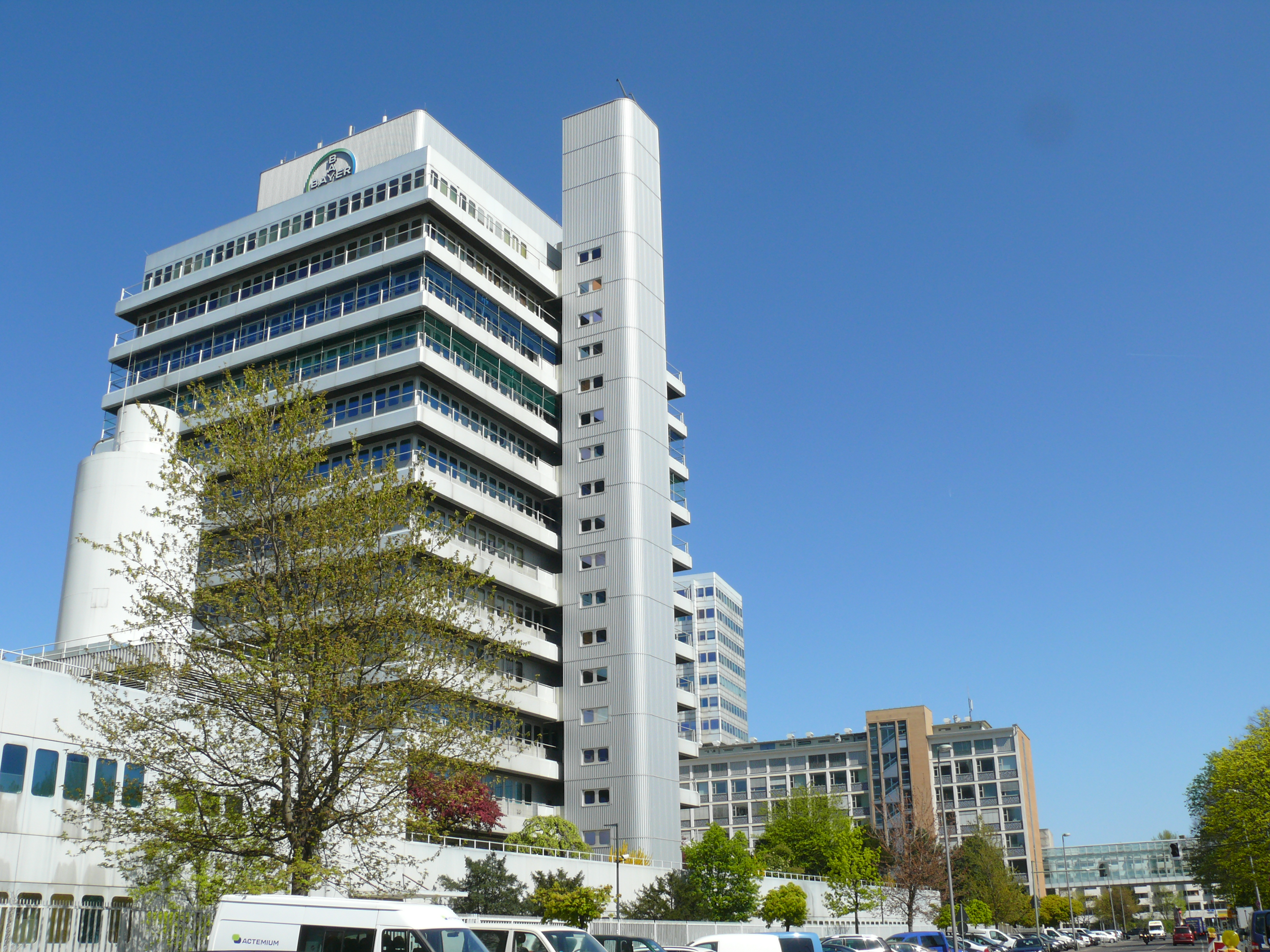
Headquarters of Bayer Pharmaceuticals in Berlin-Wedding

The Pharmaceuticals Division focuses on prescription products, especially for women's healthcare and cardiology, and also on specialty therapeutics in the areas of oncology, hematology and ophthalmology. The division also comprises the Radiology Business Unit which markets contrast-enhanced diagnostic imaging equipment together with the necessary contrast agents.

In addition to internal research and development (R&D), Bayer has participated in public–private partnerships. One example in the area of non-clinical safety assessment is the InnoMed PredTox program. Another is the Innovative Medicines Initiative of EFPIA and the European Commission.

=== Defunct business units ===
Bayer Chemicals AG (with the exception of H.C. Starck and Wolff Walsrode) was combined with certain components of the polymers segment to form the new company Lanxess on 1 July 2004; Lanxess was listed on the Frankfurt Stock Exchange in early 2005. Bayer HealthCare's Diagnostics Division was acquired by Siemens Medical Solutions in January 2007.

Bayer sold its Animal Health business to Elanco in 2020.

Bayer Diabetes Care managed Bayer's medical devices portfolio. Key products included the blood glucose monitors Contour Next EZ (XT), Contour, Contour USB and Breeze 2 used in the management of diabetes. The diabetes business unit was sold to Panasonic Healthcare Co. for $1.15 billion in June 2015. Bayer MaterialScience was a supplier of high-tech polymers, and developed solutions for a broad range of applications relevant to everyday life. On 18 September 2014, the Board of Directors of Bayer AG announced plans to float the Bayer MaterialScience business on the stock market as a separate entity. On 1 June 2015, Bayer announced that the new company would be named Covestro; Bayer formally spun out Covestro in September 2015.

== Ownership ==
The 10 largest shareholders of Bayer AG in early 2024 were:

| Shareholder name | Percentage |
|---|---|
| Temasek Holdings | 3.5% |
| Norges Bank | 3.1% |
| Silchester International Investors | 3.0% |
| Amundi | 0.9% |
| MFS Investment Management (UK) | 0.6% |
| Universal-Investment-Gesellschaft mbH | 0.5% |
| Lyxor | 0.4% |
| Union Investment Institutional GmbH | 0.4% |
| Union Investment Privatfonds GmbH | 0.4% |
| HSBC Global Asset Management GmbH | 0.4% |
| Others | 86.8% |

== Finances ==
For the fiscal year 2017, Bayer reported earnings of EUR€7.3 billion, with an annual revenue of EUR€35 billion, a decrease of 25.1% over the previous fiscal cycle. Bayer's shares traded at over €69 per share, and its market capitalization was valued at US€65.4 billion in November 2018. In September 2019, Bayer announced to reduce the number of management board members from seven to five to reduce overall costs. In 2025, Bayer increased its R&D investments by 22.6%; contributing to the European growth in R&D outpacing other regions that year.

The key trends of Bayer are (as at the financial year ending 31 December):

| Year | Revenue (Note: "Sales") (€ bn) | Net income (Note: "Net income (from continuing and discontinued operations)") (€ bn) | Total assets (€ bn) | Research and development expenses (€ bn) | Employees |
|---|---|---|---|---|---|
| 2013 | 40.1 | 3.1 | 51.3 | 3.4 | 112,360 |
| 2014 | 42.2 | 3.4 | 70.2 | 3.5 | 118,888 |
| 2015 | 46.3 | 4.1 | 73.9 | 4.2 | 116,800 |
| 2016 | 46.7 | 4.5 | 82.2 | 4.4 | 115,200 |
| 2017* | 35.0 | 7.3 | 75.0 | 4.5 | 99,820 |
| 2018 | 39.5 | 1.6 | 126 | 5.1 | 107,894 |
| 2019 | 43.5 | 4.0 | 126 | 5.3 | 103,824 |
| 2020 | 41.4 | −10.4 | 117 | 7.1 | 99,538 |
| 2021 | 44.0 | 1.0 | 120 | 5.4 | 99,637 |
| 2022 | 50.7 | 4.1 | 124 | 6.5 | 101,369 |
| 2023 | 47.6 | −2.9 | 116 | | 99,723 |
| 2024 | 46.6 | −2.6 | 111 | | 96,184 |
| 2025 | 45.6 | −3.6 | 105 | | 89,754 |

* without Covestro from 2017 on

== Bayer Leverkusen ==
In 1904, the company founded the sports club TuS 04 ("Turn- und Spielverein der Farbenfabriken vorm. Friedr. Bayer & Co."), later SV Bayer 04 ("Sportvereinigung Bayer 04 Leverkusen"), finally becoming TSV Bayer 04 Leverkusen ("Turn- und Sportverein") in 1984, generally, however, known simply as Bayer Leverkusen. The club is best known for its football team, but has been involved in many other sports, including athletics, fencing, team handball, volleyball, boxing and basketball. Bayer Leverkusen is one of the largest sports clubs in Germany. The company also supports similar clubs at other company sites, including Dormagen (particularly handball), Wuppertal (particularly volleyball), and Krefeld-Uerdingen (featuring another former Bundesliga football club, SC Bayer 05 Uerdingen, now Uerdingen 05).

== Awards and recognition ==
In October 2008, Bayer's Canadian division was named one of "Canada's Top 100 Employers" by Mediacorp Canada. The Canadian division was named one of Greater Toronto's Top Employers by the Toronto Star newspaper. Bayer USA was given a score of 85 (out of 100) in the Human Rights Campaign's 2011 Corporate Equality Index, a measure of gay and lesbian workplace equality.

In 2016, Standard Ethics Aei gave a rating to Bayer in order to include the company in its Standard Ethics German Index. Bayer received an EE− rating, the fourth tier in an eight-tier ranking.

It was ranked third in the Access to Seeds Index in 2016.

== Litigation ==
=== Roundup ===
In August 2018, two months after Bayer acquired Monsanto, a U.S. jury ordered Monsanto to pay $289 million to a school groundskeeper who claimed his non-Hodgkin's lymphoma was caused by regularly using Roundup, a glyphosate-based herbicide produced by Monsanto. Following the Johnson v. Monsanto Co. verdict, Bayer's share price dropped by around 14% or $14 billion in market capitalization. The company filed an appeal on 18 September 2018. Pending appeal, the award was later reduced to $78.5 million. In November 2018, Monsanto appealed the judgement, asking an appellate court to consider a motion for a new trial. A verdict on the appeal was delivered in June 2020 upholding the verdict but further reducing the award to $21.5 million. On 13 May 2019, a United States Superior Court Judge ordered Bayer to pay more than $2.5 billion in damages to a couple in California, both of whom contracted non-Hodgkin's Lymphoma, later cut to $87 million on appeal.

In June 2020, the company agreed to pay $9.6 billion to settle more than 10,000 lawsuits claiming harm from Roundup, saying this action will result in the resolution of 75% of those claims. Bayer will also assign $1.25 billion for future claims, an action that needs approval from the US District Court, Northern District of California. The settlement, according to the company, does not admit either liability or wrongdoing, but brings an end to irresolution in the case. The settlement does not include three cases that have already gone to jury trials and are being appealed. In July 2020, the California Court of Appeals denied the appeal but reduced the damages owed to $20.4 million. As of 2023, around 165,000 claims, more than 50,000 of which still pending, have been made against Roundup, mostly alleging that it had caused cancer.

The general consensus among national regulatory agencies, and the European Commission is that labeled usage of the herbicide poses no carcinogenic or genotoxic risk to humans. In January 2020, the US Environmental Protection Agency (EPA) finalized its interim registration review for Roundup, stating that it "did not identify any risks of concern" for cancer and other risks to humans from glyphosate exposure. On 17 June 2022, California-based United States Court of Appeals for the Ninth Circuit ordered the Environmental Protection Agency to reexamine this 2020 finding that glyphosate did not pose a health risk for people exposed to it by any means.

In 2024, legislation was introduced in Iowa, Missouri and Idaho with language supplied by Bayer that experts say could shield the company from any lawsuits related to cancer risk. Bayer leads a group called Modern Ag Alliance which produces advertisements claiming that lawsuits threaten the availability of glyphosate. In 2025, flyers from a dark money source were sent to constituents of Missouri senators who oppose the bill, claiming that the lawmakers' opposition would cause "Chinese Communist Party chemicals" to enter the food supply. The targeted senators allege that Bayer is behind the mailers, which Bayer denies.

In June 2026, Bayer secured an important victory before the US Supreme Court, which ruled that Bayer could not be sued under state law, thereby depriving thousands of Roundup-related lawsuits of their legal basis. In early July, Bayer also announced that it would spin off its controversial U.S. glyphosate business as an independent subsidiary under the name Ruveon.

=== Xarelto ===
In 2019, Bayer and Johnson & Johnson (who market Xarelto together) settled around 25,000 lawsuits on the blood thinning drug Xarelto (rivaroxaban) by agreeing to disburse $775 million (US) to federal and state plaintiffs who said the companies had not properly warned patients about possible fatal bleeding as a result of ingesting the drug. There was no admission of liability from the companies in the settlement as they noted they had prevailed in six previous trials. The settlement will be divided evenly between the companies.

=== One A Day Vitamins ===
In 2019, a federal jury in San Francisco sided with Bayer in a $600 million (US) class action suit alleging that the company misinformed consumers by promoting its One A Day vitamins as supporting cardiac health, vigorous immune systems and boosting user energy. The suit was first filed as a nationwide class action; in 2017, the US District Court in San Francisco said subclasses of purchasers of the vitamin in Florida, New York and California could act together.

The jury found that the plaintiffs failed to prove that Bayer misrepresented its One A Day claims, and also did not demonstrate that any of the class representative consumers who purchased One A Day relied on the so-called false information as part of their buying decision.

=== HIV contamination ===
In the mid-1980s, when Bayer's Cutter Laboratories realized that its blood products, the clotting agents Factor VIII and IX, were contaminated with HIV, the financial investment in the product was considered too high to destroy the inventory. Bayer misrepresented the results of its own research and knowingly supplied hemophilia medication tainted with HIV to patients in Asia and Latin America, without the precaution of heat treating the product, recommended for eliminating the risk. As a consequence, thousands who infused the product tested positive for HIV and later developed AIDS.

=== Dicamba ===
On 14 February 2020, Bayer and BASF were ordered to pay Missouri peach farmer Bill Bader $15 million in damages as a result of destruction of his peach trees which was caused by the usage of dicamba by nearby farmers. Dicamba was another product which Bayer acquired from Monsanto. Bayer also inherited the lawsuit from Monsanto as well. On 15 February 2020, Bayer—representing Monsanto—and BASF were ordered to pay not only the $15 million in damages, but an additional $250 million in punitive damages. Bayer and BASF afterwards announced plans to appeal the $265 million fine.

In June 2020, Bayer agreed to a settlement of up to $400 million for all 2015 to 2020 crop year dicamba claims, not including the $265 million judgement. On 25 November 2020, U.S. District Judge Stephen Limbaugh Jr. reduced the punitive damage amount in the Bader Farms case to $60 million.

=== PCB pollution ===
In June 2020, Bayer agreed to pay $800 million to settle lawsuits in a variety of jurisdictions which claimed contamination of public waterways with PCBs by Monsanto before 1978. On 25 November 2020, however, U.S. District Judge Fernando M. Olguin rejected Bayer's settlement offer, which was now at $650 million, and allowed Monsanto-related lawsuits involving PCB to proceed.

=== Talc-related liabilities ===
On 4 April 2023, a Delaware judge dismissed a lawsuit by Merck & Co's seeking to hold Bayer responsible for more talc-related liabilities, stemming from its $14.2 billion purchase of Merck's consumer care business in 2014. The judge called Bayer's interpretation of the purchase agreement "the only reasonable one", and said letting Merck "dump" cases would give them an incentive to prolong or stall lawsuits. Bayer said in a statement that it welcomed the decision, and it "will continue to defend itself against any further efforts by Merck to avoid or improperly transfer its liabilities to Bayer".

=== COVID-19 vaccine patent litigation ===
In January 2026, Bayer's Monsanto filed patent infringement lawsuits against Pfizer, BioNTech and Moderna over technology used in the manufacture of their COVID-19 vaccines. The lawsuits, filed in federal court in Delaware, alleged that the companies infringed Monsanto technology developed in the 1980s to reduce the instability of messenger RNA (mRNA) in crops. Monsanto alleged that the vaccine manufacturers used similar methods to stabilize the mRNA in their COVID-19 vaccines.

Bayer separately filed a patent infringement lawsuit against Johnson & Johnson in federal court in New Jersey, alleging that a DNA-based process used in manufacturing its COVID-19 vaccine infringed a Monsanto patent. Bayer sought unspecified monetary damages in the lawsuits but said it was not seeking to prevent the companies from manufacturing their vaccines. Bayer was not involved in developing COVID-19 vaccines and does not manufacture or sell them.

== See also ==
- List of German companies
- List of pharmaceutical companies
