= Rumpf =

Rumpf is a surname, and may refer to:

- Andreas Rumpf (1890–1966), German classical archaeologist
- Brian E. Rumpf (born 1964), American politician from New Jersey
- Ella Rumpf, Swiss actress
- Georg Eberhard Rumpf, better known as Georg Eberhard Rumphius (c. 1627–1702), German-Dutch botanist
- Gernot Rumpf (1941–2025), German sculptor
- Isaak Augustijn Rumpf (1673–1723), Governor of Dutch Ceylon
- Sabine Rumpf (born 1983), German discus thrower
- Willy Rumpf (1903–1982), German politician
