= Electrochemical gradient =

Gradient of electrochemical potential, usually for an ion that can move across a membrane

Diagram of ion concentrations and charge across a semi-permeable cellular membrane.

An electrochemical gradient is a gradient of electrochemical potential, usually for an ion that can move across a membrane. The gradient consists of two parts:

- The chemical gradient, or difference in solute concentration across a membrane.
- The electrical gradient, or difference in charge across a membrane.

If there are unequal concentrations of an ion across a permeable membrane, the ion will move across the membrane from the area of higher concentration to the area of lower concentration through simple diffusion. Ions also carry an electric charge that forms an electric potential across a membrane. If there is an unequal distribution of charges across the membrane, then the difference in electric potential generates a force that drives ion diffusion until the charges are balanced on both sides of the membrane.

Electrochemical gradients are essential to the operation of batteries and other electrochemical cells, photosynthesis and cellular respiration, and certain other biological processes.

== Overview ==
Electrochemical energy is one of the many interchangeable forms of potential energy through which energy may be conserved. It appears in electroanalytical chemistry and has industrial applications such as batteries and fuel cells. In biology, electrochemical gradients allow cells to control the direction ions move across membranes. In mitochondria and chloroplasts, proton gradients generate a chemiosmotic potential used to synthesize ATP, and the sodium-potassium gradient helps neural synapses quickly transmit information.

An electrochemical gradient has two components: a differential concentration of electric charge across a membrane and a differential concentration of chemical species across that same membrane. In the former effect, the concentrated charge attracts charges of the opposite sign; in the latter, the concentrated species tends to diffuse across the membrane to an equalize concentrations. The combination of these two phenomena determines the thermodynamically-preferred direction for an ion's movement across the membrane.

The combined effect can be quantified as a gradient in the thermodynamic electrochemical potential:
$$\nabla\overline{\mu}_i = \nabla \mu_i(\vec{r}) + z_i\mathrm{F}\nabla\varphi(\vec{r})\text{,}$$

with

- μ_{i} the chemical potential of the ion species i
- z_{i} the charge per ion of the species i
- F, Faraday constant (the electrochemical potential is implicitly measured on a per-mole basis)
- φ, the local electric potential.

Sometimes, the term "electrochemical potential" is abused to describe the electric potential generated by an ionic concentration gradient; that is, φ.

An electrochemical gradient is analogous to the water pressure across a hydroelectric dam. Routes unblocked by the membrane (e.g. membrane transport protein or electrodes) correspond to turbines that convert the water's potential energy to other forms of physical or chemical energy, and the ions that pass through the membrane correspond to water traveling into the lower river. Conversely, energy can be used to pump water up into the lake above the dam, and chemical energy can be used to create electrochemical gradients.

== Chemistry ==
The term typically applies in electrochemistry, when electrical energy in the form of an applied voltage is used to modulate the thermodynamic favorability of a chemical reaction. In a battery, an electrochemical potential arising from the movement of ions balances the reaction energy of the electrodes. The maximum voltage that a battery reaction can produce is sometimes called the standard electrochemical potential of that reaction.

== Biological context ==
The generation of a transmembrane electrical potential through ion movement across a cell membrane drives biological processes like nerve conduction, muscle contraction, hormone secretion, and sensation. By convention, physiological voltages are measured relative to the extracellular region; a typical animal cell has an internal electrical potential of (−70)–(−50) mV.

An electrochemical gradient is essential to mitochondrial oxidative phosphorylation. The final step of cellular respiration is the electron transport chain, composed of four complexes embedded in the inner mitochondrial membrane. Complexes I, III, and IV pump protons from the matrix to the intermembrane space (IMS); for every electron pair entering the chain, ten protons translocate into the IMS. The result is an electric potential of more than 200 mV. The energy resulting from the flux of protons back into the matrix is used by ATP synthase to combine inorganic phosphate and ADP.

Similar to the electron transport chain, the light-dependent reactions of photosynthesis pump protons into the thylakoid lumen of chloroplasts to drive the synthesis of ATP. The proton gradient can be generated through either noncyclic or cyclic photophosphorylation. Of the proteins that participate in noncyclic photophosphorylation, photosystem II (PSII), plastiquinone, and cytochrome b_{6}f complex directly contribute to generating the proton gradient. For each four photons absorbed by PSII, eight protons are pumped into the lumen.

Several other transporters and ion channels play a role in generating a proton electrochemical gradient. One is TPK_{3}, a potassium channel that is activated by Ca^{2+} and conducts K^{+} from the thylakoid lumen to the stroma, which helps establish the electric field. On the other hand, the electro-neutral K^{+} efflux antiporter (KEA_{3}) transports K^{+} into the thylakoid lumen and H^{+} into the stroma, which helps establish the pH gradient.

== Ion gradients ==
Diagram of the Na^{+}-K^{+}-ATPase.

Since the ions are charged, they cannot pass through cellular membranes via simple diffusion. Two different mechanisms can transport the ions across the membrane: active or passive transport.

An example of active transport of ions is the Na^{+}-K^{+}-ATPase (NKA). NKA is powered by the hydrolysis of ATP into ADP and an inorganic phosphate; for every molecule of ATP hydrolized, three Na^{+} are transported outside and two K^{+} are transported inside the cell. This makes the inside of the cell more negative than the outside and more specifically generates a membrane potential V_{membrane} of about −60 mV.

An example of passive transport is ion fluxes through Na^{+}, K^{+}, Ca^{2+}, and Cl^{−} channels. Unlike active transport, passive transport is powered by the arithmetic sum of osmosis (a concentration gradient) and an electric field (the transmembrane potential). Formally, the molar Gibbs free energy change associated with successful transport is $\Delta G = RT\ln{\!\left(\frac{c_{\rm in}}{c_{\rm out}}\right)} + (Fz)V_{\rm membrane}$ where R represents the gas constant, T represents absolute temperature, z is the charge per ion, and F represents the Faraday constant.

In the example of Na^{+}, both terms tend to support transport: the negative electric potential inside the cell attracts the positive ion and since Na^{+} is concentrated outside the cell, osmosis supports diffusion through the Na^{+} channel into the cell. In the case of K^{+}, the effect of osmosis is reversed: although external ions are attracted by the negative intracellular potential, entropy seeks to diffuse the ions already concentrated inside the cell. The converse phenomenon (osmosis supports transport, electric potential opposes it) can be achieved for Na^{+} in cells with abnormal transmembrane potentials: at +70 mV, the Na^{+} influx halts; at higher potentials, it becomes an efflux.

Common cellular ion concentrations (millimolar)
Ion	Mammal		Squid axon		S. cerevisiae	E. coli	Sea water
Ion	Cell	Blood	Cell	Blood	S. cerevisiae	E. coli	Sea water
K^{+}	100 - 140	4-5	400	10 - 20	300	30 - 300	10
Na^{+}	5-15	145	50	440	30	10	500
Mg^{2+}	10 (Note: Bound); 0.5 - 0.8 (Note: Free)	1 - 1.5			50	30 - 100; 0.01 - 1	50
Ca^{2+}	10^{−4}	2.2 - 2.6 (Note: Total); 1.3 - 1.5 (Note: Ionised)	10^{−4} - 3×10^{−4}	10	2	3; 10^{−4}	10
Cl^{−}	4	110	40 - 150	560	10 - 200 (Note: Medium dependent)		500
X^{−} (negatively charged proteins)	138	9	300 - 400	5-10			
HCO_{3}^{−}	12	29					
pH	7.1 - 7.3	7.35 to 7.45 (normal arterial blood pH); 6.9 - 7.8 (overall range)				7.2 - 7.8	8.1 - 8.2

== Proton gradients ==
Proton gradients in particular are important in many types of cells as a form of energy storage. The gradient is usually used to drive ATP synthase, flagellar rotation, or metabolite transport. This section will focus on three processes that help establish proton gradients in their respective cells: bacteriorhodopsin and noncyclic photophosphorylation and oxidative phosphorylation.

=== Bacteriorhodopsin ===
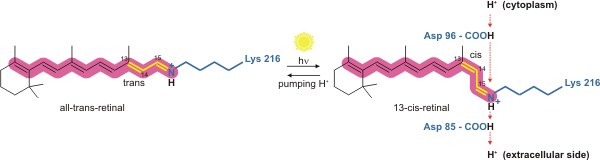
Diagram of the conformational shift in retinal that initiates proton pumping in bacteriorhodopsin.

The way bacteriorhodopsin generates a proton gradient in Archaea is through a proton pump. The proton pump relies on proton carriers to drive protons from the side of the membrane with a low H^{+} concentration to the side of the membrane with a high H^{+} concentration. In bacteriorhodopsin, the proton pump is activated by absorption of photons of 568 nm wavelength, which leads to isomerization of the Schiff base (SB) in retinal forming the K state. This moves SB away from Asp85 and Asp212, causing H^{+} transfer from the SB to Asp85 forming the M1 state. The protein then shifts to the M2 state by separating Glu204 from Glu194 which releases a proton from Glu204 into the external medium. The SB is reprotonated by Asp96 which forms the N state. It is important that the second proton comes from Asp96 since its deprotonated state is unstable and rapidly reprotonated with a proton from the cytosol. The protonation of Asp85 and Asp96 causes re-isomerization of the SB, forming the O state. Finally, bacteriorhodopsin returns to its resting state when Asp85 releases its proton to Glu204.

=== Photophosphorylation ===
Simplified diagram of photophosphorylation.

PSII also relies on light to drive the formation of proton gradients in chloroplasts, however, PSII utilizes vectorial redox chemistry to achieve this goal. Rather than physically transporting protons through the protein, reactions requiring the binding of protons will occur on the extracellular side while reactions requiring the release of protons will occur on the intracellular side. Absorption of photons of 680 nm wavelength is used to excite two electrons in P_{680} to a higher energy level. These higher energy electrons are transferred to protein-bound plastoquinone (PQ_{A}) and then to unbound plastoquinone (PQ_{B}). This reduces plastoquinone (PQ) to plastoquinol (PQH_{2}) which is released from PSII after gaining two protons from the stroma. The electrons in P_{680} are replenished by oxidizing water through the oxygen-evolving complex (OEC). This results in release of O_{2} and H^{+} into the lumen, for a total reaction of

$\ce{4h\nu + 2H2O + 2PQ + 4H+ stroma -> O2 + 2PQH2 + 4H+ lumen}$

After being released from PSII, PQH_{2} travels to the cytochrome b_{6}f complex, which then transfers two electrons from PQH_{2} to plastocyanin in two separate reactions. The process that occurs is similar to the Q-cycle in Complex III of the electron transport chain. In the first reaction, PQH_{2} binds to the complex on the lumen side and one electron is transferred to the iron-sulfur center which then transfers it to cytochrome f which then transfers it to plastocyanin. The second electron is transferred to heme b_{L} which then transfers it to heme b_{H} which then transfers it to PQ. In the second reaction, a second PQH_{2} gets oxidized, adding an electron to another plastocyanin and PQ. Both reactions together transfer four protons into the lumen.

=== Oxidative phosphorylation ===
Detailed diagram of the electron transport chain in mitochondria.

In the electron transport chain, complex I (CI) catalyzes the reduction of ubiquinone (UQ) to ubiquinol (UQH_{2}) by the transfer of two electrons from reduced nicotinamide adenine dinucleotide (NADH) which translocates four protons from the mitochondrial matrix to the IMS:
$$\ce{NADH} + \ce{H^+} + \ce{UQ} + 4\underbrace{\ce{H^+}}_{\mathrm{matrix}} \longrightarrow \ce{NAD^+} + \ce{UQH_2} + 4\underbrace{\ce{H^+}}_{\mathrm{IMS}}$$

Complex III (CIII) catalyzes the Q-cycle. The first step involving the transfer of two electrons from the UQH_{2} reduced by CI to two molecules of oxidized cytochrome c at the Q_{o} site. In the second step, two more electrons reduce UQ to UQH_{2} at the Q_{i} site. The total reaction is:
$$2\underbrace{\text{cytochrome c}}_{\text{oxidized}}+\ce{UQH_2}+2\underbrace{\ce{H^+}}_{\text{matrix}}\longrightarrow2\underbrace{\text{cytochrome c}}_{\text{reduced}}+\ce{UQ}+4\underbrace{\ce{H^+}}_{\text{IMS}}$$

Complex IV (CIV) catalyzes the transfer of two electrons from the cytochrome c reduced by CIII to one half of a full oxygen. Utilizing one full oxygen in oxidative phosphorylation requires the transfer of four electrons. The oxygen will then consume four protons from the matrix to form water while another four protons are pumped into the IMS, to give a total reaction
$$2\text{cytochrome c}(\text{reduced})+4\ce{H+}(\text{matrix})+\frac{1}{2}\ce{O2}\longrightarrow2\text{cytochrome c}(\text{oxidized})+2\ce{H+}(\text{IMS})+\ce{H2O}$$

== See also ==
- Concentration cell
- Transmembrane potential difference
- Action potential
- Cell potential
- Electrodiffusion
- Galvanic cell
- Electrochemical cell
- Proton exchange membrane
- Reversal potential
