= Cytochrome d =

Ubiquinol oxidase (electrogenic, proton-motive force generating; Cytochrome bd)
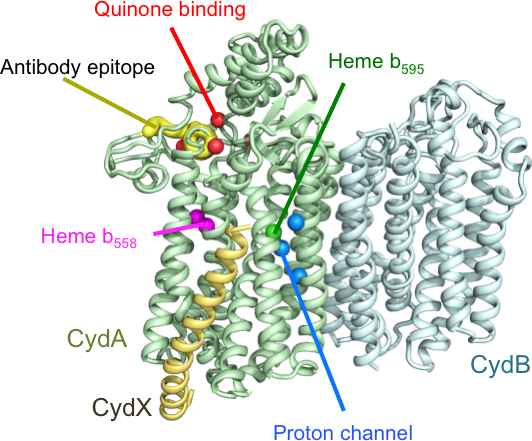
- Predicted structure of E. coli Cytochrome bd-1

Identifiers
- EC no.: 7.1.1.7

Databases
- BRENDA: enzyme data
- ExPASy: NiceZyme view
- KEGG: enzyme entry
- MetaCyc: metabolic pathway
- Rhea: reactions
- PDB structures: RCSB PDB PDBe PDBsum
Search
- PMC: articles
- PubMed: articles
- NCBI: proteins

Cytochrome d, previously known as cytochrome a_{2}, is a name for all cytochromes (electron-transporting heme proteins) that contain heme D as a cofactor. Two unrelated classes of cytochrome d are known: Cytochrome bd, an enzyme that generates a charge across the membrane so that protons will move, and cytochrome cd_{1} (NirS; SCOP b.70.2), a nitrite reductase.

Cytochrome bd is found in plenty of aerobic bacteria, especially when it has grown with a limited oxygen supply. Compared to other terminal oxidases, it is notable for its high oxygen affinity and resistance to cyanide poisoning. It has a group of very similar relatives that do not use heme D, known as cyanide insensitive oxidases (CIOs).

== Function ==
Structure of Heme D.

Cytochrome d is, as other proteins of its family, a membrane-bound hemoprotein, but unlike cytochromes a and b, cytochrome D has a heme D instead of a heme A or heme B group.

Cytochrome d is part of the cytochrome bd terminal oxidase which catalyse the two electron oxidation of ubiquinol. This process is an oxidative phosphorylation that oxidizes the ubiquinol-8 to ubiquinone. The chemical reaction followed by this process is:

Ubiquinol-8 + O_{2} → Ubiquinone-8 + H_{2}O

By a similar reaction, it also catalyses the reduction of oxygen to water, which involves 4 electrons.

As a terminal oxidase, the reaction generates a proton motive force:

2 ubiquinol[inner membrane] + O_{2} + 4 H^{+}[cytoplasm] → 2 ubiquinone[inner membrane] + 2 H_{2}O + 4 H^{+}[periplasm]

Some members of the family may accept or prefer other electron-transporting quinols such as menaquinol or plastoquinol in lieu of ubiquinol.

== Structure ==
Cytochrome bd (OPM family 805) is a tri-heme oxidase as it is compound by cytochromes b_{558}, b_{595} and d. Its main function is the reduction of O_{2} to H_{2}O. It is thought that it uses a di-heme active site, which is formed by the hemes of cytochromes b_{595} and d. These two cytochromes are considered high-spin complexes, what is directly related to the electrons' spin. While other respiratory terminal oxidases which catalyze that same reaction have a heme-copper active site and use a proton pump, cytochrome bd has an active site with iron instead of copper and need no proton pump as they can produce a proton-motion force themselves. They are embedded in the bacterial cytoplasmic bilayer and serve as terminal oxidases in the respiratory chain.

The oxidases tend to have two or three subunits. Subunits 1 (InterPro: IPR003317) and 2 (InterPro: IPR002585) are predicted to have pseudo-symmetry, and are sufficient to bind the two heme b molecules. Some proteobacterial assemblies require a third subunit (InterPro: IPR012994) to bind heme d; others do not.

The high-resolution structure heterotrimeric Cytochromes bd from Geobacillus species has been determined (PDB: 5IR6, 5DOQ). The third subunit does not share sequence homology with the third subunit of proteobacteria, but does come into the assemblies at a similar position.

== Occurrence ==
=== Escherichia coli ===
E. coli possess two sets of Cytochrome bd. The bd-I complex (CydABX) is a heterotrimer, while the bd-II complex (AppCB) is a heterodimer. There is an AppX gene that may correspond to a subunit 3 for AppCB.

The ability of bd-II to generate a proton motive force is a matter of recent debate, putting it under the nonelectrogenic Ubiquinol oxidase (H+-transporting) in some categorizations.

=== Azotobacter vinelandii ===
Azotobacter vinelandii is a nitrogen-fixing bacterium which is known by its high respiratory rate among aerobic organisms. Some physiological studies postulate that cytochrome d functions as a terminal oxidase in the membranes of this organism, taking part in the electron transport system. The studies characterized the different genes in the two subunits (Q09049, C1DEL1; third subunit C1DEL0). A very extensive homology with CydAB of the E. coli was found in these studies.

== Spectra ==
Generally, in protein complexes, cytochrome D gives an absorption band of approximately 636 nm or 638 nm, depending on the cytochrome d form. If it is oxidized, the band has a length of 636 nm, and a 638 nm length if it is reduced. It is commonly associated to certain prosthetic groups when found in multiple subunit complexes. Detecting cytochrome d as Fe(II) pyridine alkaline hemachrome is very difficult because the stability under these conditions is limited. If cytochrome d is pulled out of the protein complex (as heme D) and placed in ether containing from 1 to 5 % of HCl, it gives a different absorption band (603 nm, in the oxidized form).
