= Cytochrome c family =

Protein family

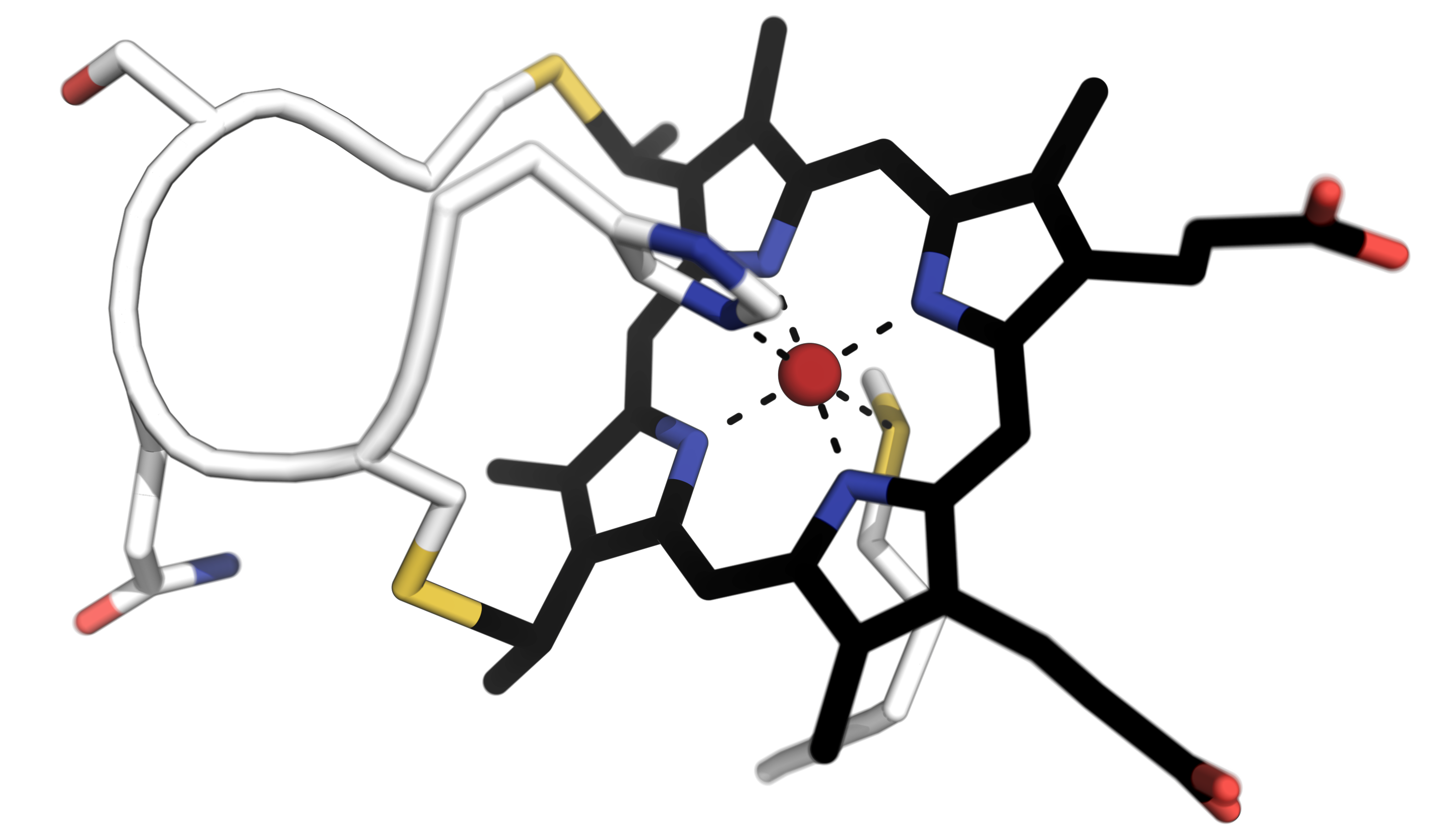
The CXXCH heme binding motif in cytochrome c proteins. Amino acid side chains are shown in white and heme is colored black.

Cytochromes c (cyt c, c-type cytochromes) cytochromes, or heme-containing proteins, that have heme C covalently attached to the peptide backbone via one or two thioether bonds. These bonds are in most cases part of a specific Cys-X-X-Cys-His (CXXCH) binding motif, where X denotes a miscellaneous amino acid. Two thioether bonds of cysteine residues bind to the vinyl sidechains of heme, and the histidine residue coordinates one axial binding site of the heme iron. Less common binding motifs can include a single thioether linkage, a lysine or a methionine instead of the axial histidine or a CX_{n}CH binding motif with n>2. The second axial site of the iron can be coordinated by amino acids of the protein, substrate molecules or water. Cytochromes c possess a wide range of properties and function as electron transfer proteins or catalyse chemical reactions involving redox processes. A prominent member of this family is mitochondrial cytochrome c.

== Classification ==
Cytochrome c (Class I)
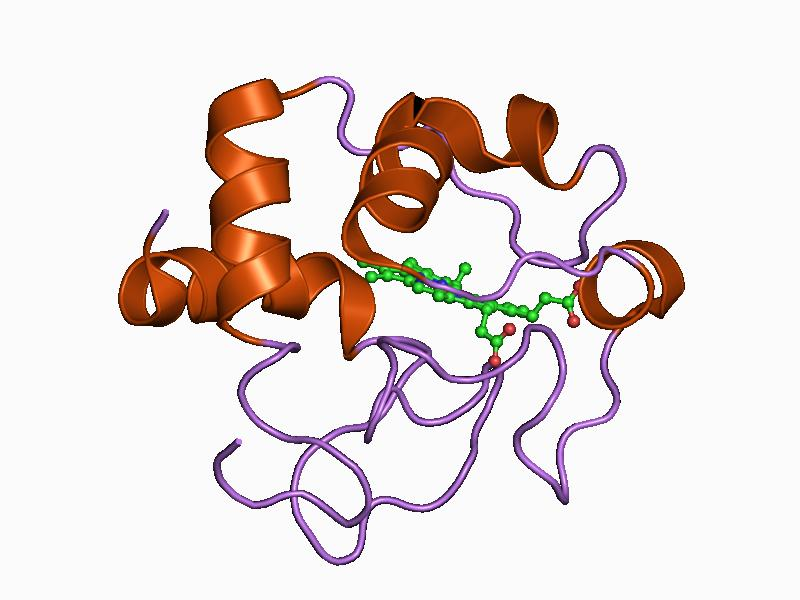
- Structure of cytochrome c2 from Rhodopseudomonas viridis (PDB: 1CRY; P00083).

Identifiers
- Symbol: Cytochrom_C
- Pfam: PF00034
- InterPro: IPR009056
- PROSITE: PDOC00169
- SCOP2: 1cry / SCOPe / SUPFAM
- OPM superfamily: 71
- OPM protein: 1hrc
- Membranome: 210
Available protein structures:
- PDB: IPR009056 PF00034 (ECOD; PDBsum)
- AlphaFold: IPR009056; PF00034

Cytochrome c (Class II)
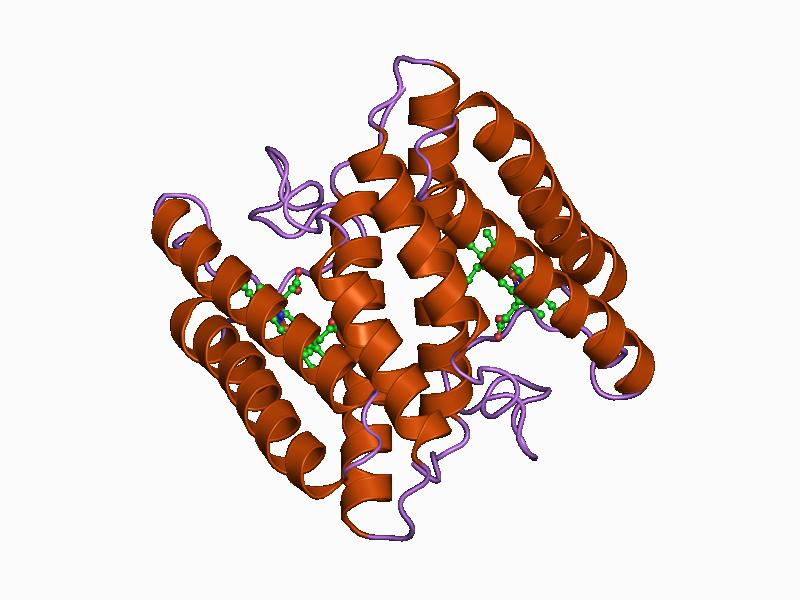
- Atomic structure of a cytochrome c with an unusual ligand-controlled dimer dissociation at a resolution of 1.8 Ångström (PDB: 1BBH; P00154).

Identifiers
- Symbol: Cytochrom_C_2
- Pfam: PF01322
- InterPro: IPR002321
- PROSITE: PDOC00169
- SCOP2: 1cgo / SCOPe / SUPFAM
Available protein structures:
- PDB: IPR002321 PF01322 (ECOD; PDBsum)
- AlphaFold: IPR002321; PF01322

High molecular weight cytochrome c (Class III)
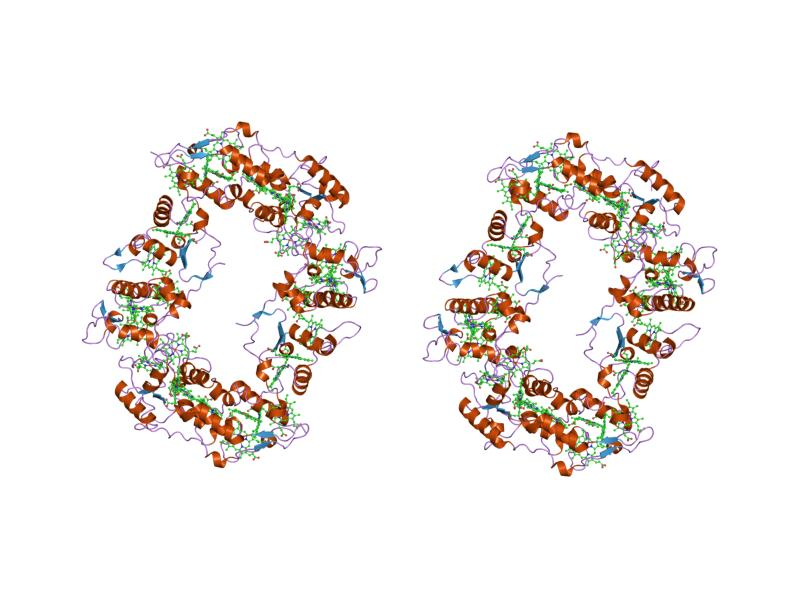
- Structure of the 16-heme cytochrome c Hmc from Desulfovibrio vulgaris Hildenborough (PDB: 1H29; P24092).

Identifiers
- Symbol: Cytochrom_CIII
- Pfam: PF02085
- Pfam clan: CL0317
- InterPro: IPR020942
- SCOP2: 2cdv / SCOPe / SUPFAM
- CDD: cd08168
Available protein structures:
- PDB: IPR020942 PF02085 (ECOD; PDBsum)
- AlphaFold: IPR020942; PF02085

Cytochrome c proteins can be divided in four classes based on their size, number of heme groups and reduction potentials:

=== Class I ===
Small soluble cytochrome c proteins with a molecular weight of 8-12 kDa and a single heme group belong to class I. It includes the low-spin soluble cytC of mitochondria and bacteria, with the heme-attachment site located towards the N-terminus, and the sixth ligand provided by a methionine residue about 40 residues further on towards the C-terminus. The typical class I fold contains five α-helices. On the basis of sequence similarity, class I cytC were further subdivided into five classes, IA to IE. Class IB includes the eukaryotic mitochondrial cyt c and prokaryotic 'short' cyt c_{2} exemplified by Rhodopila globiformis cyt c_{2}; class IA includes 'long' cyt c_{2}, such as Rhodospirillum rubrum cyt c_{2} and Aquaspirillum itersonii cyt c_{550}, which have several extra loops by comparison with class IB cyt c.

The linked InterPro entry represents mono-haem cytochrome c proteins (excluding class II and f-type cytochromes), such as cytochromes c, c1, c2, c5, c555, c550-c553, c556, c6 and cbb3. Diheme cytochrome c (InterPro: IPR018588) are proteins with a class I cluster and a unique cluster.

==== Subclasses ====
- Cytochrome c, class IA/IB InterPro: IPR002327
- Cytochrome c, class IC InterPro: IPR008168
- Cytochrome c, class ID InterPro: IPR002324
- Cytochrome c, class IE InterPro: IPR002323

=== Class II ===
The heme group in class II cytochrome c proteins is attached to a C-terminal binding motif. The structural fold of class II c-type cytochromes contains a four α-helix bundle with the covalently attached heme group at its core. Representatives of class II are the high-spin cytochrome c' and a number of low-spin cytochromes c, e.g. cyt c_{556}. The cyt c' are capable of binding such ligands as CO, NO or CN^{−}, albeit with rate and equilibrium constants 100 to 1,000,000-fold smaller than other high-spin hemeproteins. This, coupled with its relatively low redox potential, makes it unlikely that cyt c' is a terminal oxidase. Thus cyt c' probably functions as an electron transfer protein. The 3D structures of a number of cyt c' have been determined which show that the proteins usually exist as a dimer. The Chromatium vinosum cyt c' exhibits dimer dissociation upon ligand binding.

=== Class III ===
Proteins containing multiple covalently attached heme groups with low redox potential are included in class III. The heme C groups, all bis-histidinyl coordinated, are structurally and functionally nonequivalent and present different redox potentials in the range 0 to −400 mV. Members of this class are e.g. cytochrome c_{7} (triheme), cytochrome c_{3} (tetraheme), and high-molecular-weight cytochrome c (Hmc), containing 16 heme groups with only 30-40 residues per heme group. The 3D structures of a number of cyt c_{3} proteins have been determined. The proteins consist of four or five α-helices and two β-sheets wrapped around a compact core of four non-parallel hemes, which present a relatively high degree of exposure to the solvent. The overall protein architecture, heme plane orientations and iron-iron distances are highly conserved.

An example is the photosynthetic reaction centre of Rhodopseudomonas viridis that contains a tetraheme cytochrome c subunit.

=== Class IV ===
According to Ambler (1991), Cytochrome c proteins containing other prosthetic groups besides heme C, such as flavocytochromes c (sulfide dehydrogenase) and cytochromes cd_{1} (nitrite reductase) belong to class IV. As this grouping is more related to how the heme group is used instead of what the domains themselves look like, proteins placed in this group tend to be scattered in others in bioinformatic groupings.

== Biogenesis ==
The attachment of the heme group is physically separated from the protein biosynthesis. Proteins are synthesized within the cytoplasm and endoplasmic reticulum, while the maturation of cytochromes c occurs in the periplasm of prokaryotes, the intermembrane space of mitochondria or the stroma of chloroplasts. Several biochemical pathways have been discovered that differ depending on organism.

=== System I ===
Also called cytochrome c maturation (ccm) and found in Pseudomonadota, plant mitochondria, some protozoal mitochondria, deinococci, and archaea. Ccm comprises at least eight membrane proteins (CcmABCDEFGH) that are needed for electron transfer to the heme group, apo-cytochrome handling and attachment of the heme to the apo-cytochrome. An ABC-transporter-like complex formed by CcmA_{2}BCD attaches a heme group to CcmE with the use of ATP. CcmE transports the heme to CcmF where the attachment to the apo-cytochrome occurs. Transport of the apoprotein from the cytoplasm to the periplasm happens via the Sec translocation system. CcmH is used by the system to recognize the apo-cytochrome and direct it to CcmF.

=== System II ===
Cytochromes c in chloroplasts, Gram-positive bacteria, cyanobacteria, and some Pseudomonadota are produced by the cytochrome c synthesis (ccs) system. It is composed of two membrane proteins CcsB and CcsA. The CcsBA protein complex was suggested to act as a heme transporter during the attachment process. In some organisms such as Helicobacter hepaticus both proteins are found as a fused single protein. Apoprotein transport occurs via the Sec translocon as well.

=== System III ===
Fungal, vertebrate and invertebrate mitochondria produce cytochrome c proteins with a single enzyme called HCCS (holocytochrome c synthase) or cytochrome c heme lyase (CCHL). The protein is attached to the inner membrane of the intermembrane space. In some organisms, such as Saccharomyces cerevisiae, cytochrome c and cytochrome c_{1} are synthesized by separate heme lyases, CCHL and CC1HL respectively. In Homo sapiens a single HCCS is used for the biosynthesis of both cytochrome c proteins.

=== System IV ===
Four membrane proteins are necessary for the attachment of a heme in cytochrome b6. A major difference to systems I-III is that the heme attachment occurs at the opposite side of the lipid bilayer compared to the other systems.

== Human proteins containing this domain ==
CYCS; CYC1
