= Lupanine 17-hydroxylase (cytochrome c) =

Identifiers
- EC no.: 1.17.2.2

Databases
- BRENDA: enzyme data
- ExPASy: NiceZyme view
- KEGG: enzyme entry
- MetaCyc: metabolic pathway
- Rhea: reactions
- PDB structures: RCSB PDB PDBe PDBsum
Search
- PMC: articles
- PubMed: articles
- NCBI: proteins

Lupanine 17-hydroxylase (cytochrome c) (EC 1.17.2.2, lupanine dehydrogenase (cytochrome c)) is an enzyme with systematic name lupanine:cytochrome c-oxidoreductase (17-hydroxylating). This enzyme catalyses the following chemical reaction

lupanine
+ 2 Fe^{3+}
H_{2}O
2 H^{+}
17-hydroxylupanine
+ 2 Fe^{2+}

The oxidation is driven by cytochrome c in its oxidised ferric (Fe^{3+}) form. The enzyme isolated from Pseudomonas putida contains heme C and requires pyrroloquinoline quinone for activity.
