= Cytochrome =

Family of proteins containing a heme

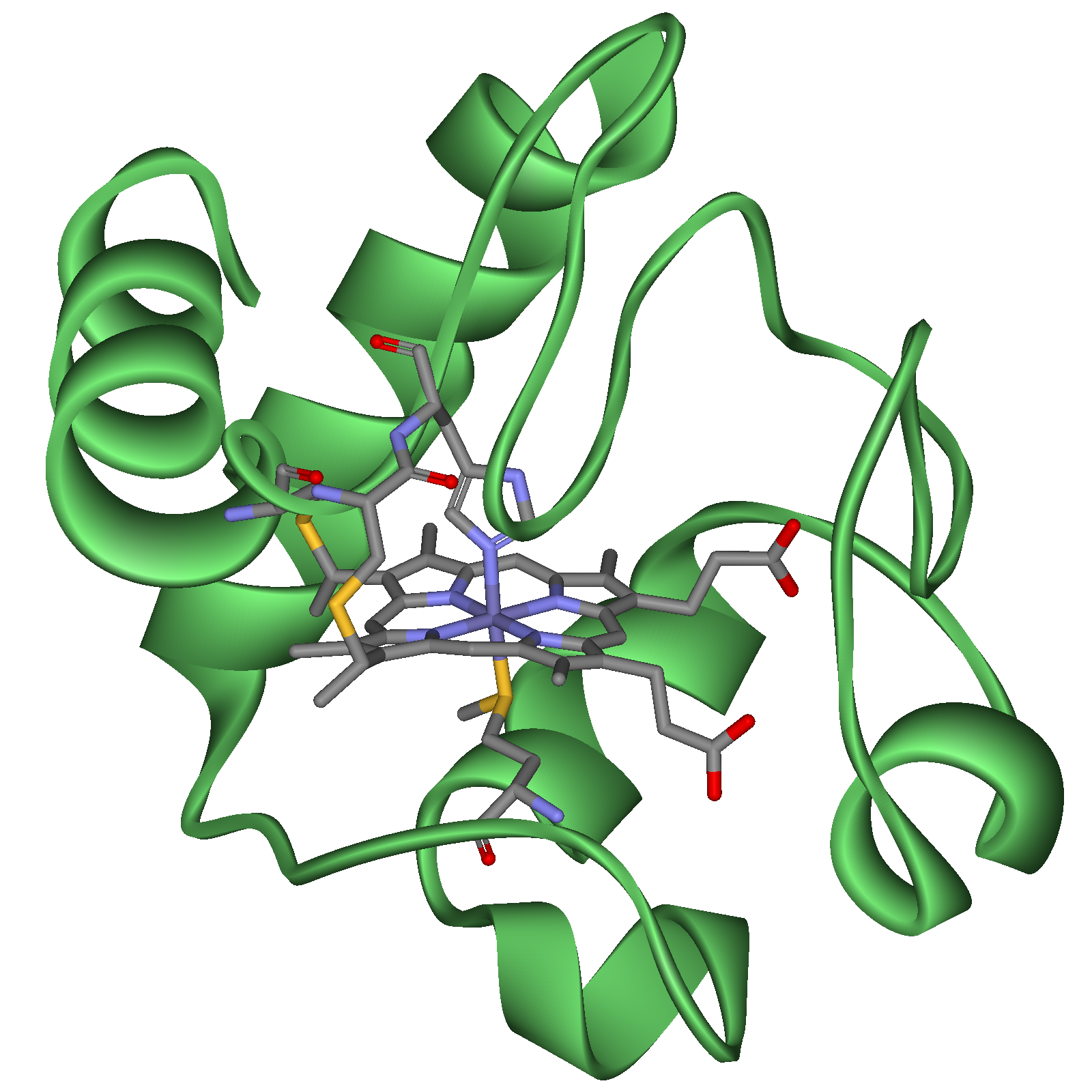
Cytochrome c with heme c.

Cytochromes are heme-containing proteins that function to transfer electrons. Cytochromes are generally involved in the electron transport chain and redox catalysis. Despite their name, members of the cytochrome p450 (CYP) family are not cytochromes by the strict definition since they generally function as oxygenases.

Cytochromes are often classified into four groups according to the type of heme and its mode of binding. The International Union of Biochemistry and Molecular Biology (IUBMB) defines the groups as: cytochrome a group, cytochrome b group, cytochromes c group and cytochrome d group. Most hemoproteins found in cells are considered cytochromes with the exceptions of hemoglobin, myoglobin, peroxidases, catalase, tryptophan 2,3-dioxygenase, nitrite reductases, sulfite reductases, and the CYP family.

Cytochrome function is linked to the reversible redox change from ferrous (Fe(II)) to the ferric (Fe(III)) oxidation state of the iron found in the heme core.

== History ==
Cytochromes were initially described in 1884 by Charles Alexander MacMunn as respiratory pigments (myohematin or histohematin). In the 1920s, Keilin rediscovered these respiratory pigments and named them the cytochromes, or “cellular pigments”. He classified these heme proteins on the basis of the position of their lowest energy absorption band in their reduced state, as cytochromes a (605 nm), b (≈565 nm), and c (550 nm). The ultra-violet (UV) to visible spectroscopic signatures of hemes are still used to identify heme type from the reduced bis-pyridine-ligated state, i.e., the pyridine hemochrome method. Within each class, cytochrome a, b, or c, early cytochromes are numbered consecutively, e.g. cyt c, cyt c_{1}, and cyt c_{2}, with more recent examples designated by their reduced state R-band maximum, e.g. cyt c_{559}.

== Structure and function ==
The heme group is a highly conjugated ring system (which allows its electrons to be very mobile) surrounding an iron ion. The iron in cytochromes usually exists in a ferrous (Fe^{2+}) and a ferric (Fe^{3+}) state with a ferroxo (Fe^{4+}) state found in catalytic intermediates. Cytochromes are, thus, capable of performing electron transfer reactions and catalysis by reduction or oxidation of their heme iron. The cellular location of cytochromes depends on their function. They can be found as globular proteins and membrane proteins.

In the process of oxidative phosphorylation, a globular cytochrome cc protein is involved in the electron transfer from the membrane-bound complex III to complex IV. Complex III itself is composed of several subunits, one of which is a b-type cytochrome while another one is a c-type cytochrome. Both domains are involved in electron transfer within the complex. Complex IV contains a cytochrome a/a3-domain that transfers electrons and catalyzes the reaction of oxygen to water. Photosystem II, the first protein complex in the light-dependent reactions of oxygenic photosynthesis, contains a cytochrome b subunit. Cytochromes also have many functions outside of the electron transport chain in humans. For example, CYB5A is a cytochrome b which serves multiple roles, including activating 17,20 Lyase (required for sex steroid production), and reducing methemoglobin into functional hemoglobin.

In the early 1960s, a linear evolution of cytochromes was suggested by Emanuel Margoliash that led to the molecular clock hypothesis. The apparently constant evolution rate of cytochromes can be a helpful tool in trying to determine when various organisms may have diverged from a common ancestor.

== Types ==
Several kinds of cytochrome exist and can be distinguished by spectroscopy, exact structure of the heme group, inhibitor sensitivity, and reduction potential.

Four groups of cytochromes are distinguished by their prosthetic groups:

Type	Prosthetic group
Cytochrome a group	heme A
Cytochrome b group	heme B
Cytochrome c group	heme C (covalently bound heme b)
Cytochrome d group	heme D (Heme B with γ-spirolactone)

There is no "cytochrome e," but cytochrome f, found in the cytochrome b_{6}f complex of plants is a c-type cytochrome. The term cytochrome o has been used, but has been designated by the IUBMB as cytochrome b', part of the cytochrome b group.

In mitochondria and chloroplasts, these cytochromes are often combined in electron transport and related metabolic pathways:

Cytochromes	Combination
a and a_{3}	Cytochrome c oxidase ("Complex IV") with electrons delivered to complex by soluble cytochrome c (hence the name)
b and c_{1}	Coenzyme Q - cytochrome c reductase ("Complex III")
b_{6} and f	Plastoquinol—plastocyanin reductase

== Examples ==
=== Cytochrome a group ===
- Cytochrome aa_{3}, part of the cytochrome c oxidase complex. It contains separate cytochrome a and cytochrome a_{3} components.
- Cytochrome a_{1}, a protein found in bacterial species nitrobacter agilis.

=== Cytochrome b group ===
- Cytochrome b/cytochrome b_{6}, electron transport proteins that are part of the bc complex.
- Cytochrome b_{5} family, family that includes CYB5A which is involved in CYP enzyme activation.
- Cytochrome b_{561} family, family that includes CYB561 which reduces iron ions.

=== Cytochrome c group ===
- Cytochrome c (CYCS), a protein involved in the electron transport chain.
- Cytochrome c_{1} (CYC1), acts as an electron donor for cytochrome c.

=== Cytochrome p450 family ===
The cytochrome P450 family are a distinct family of heme-binding proteins named for the characteristic Soret peak formed by absorbance of light at wavelengths near 450 when the heme iron is reduced (with sodium dithionite) and complexed to carbon monoxide. These enzymes are primarily involved in steroidogenesis and detoxification. They are not considered cytochromes in the strict sense, but would be part of cytochrome b group under a relaxed definition.
