= Flavocytochrome c sulfide dehydrogenase =

Sulfide-cytochrome-c reductase (flavocytochrome c)
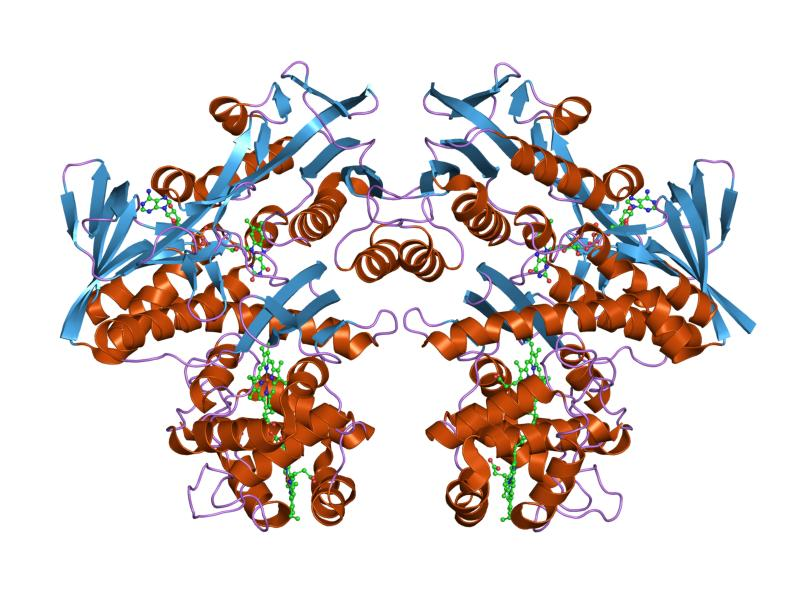
- Structure of the flavocytochrome c sulfide dehydrogenase from the purple phototrophic bacterium Allochromatium vinosum (PDB: 1FCD).

Identifiers
- EC no.: 1.8.2.3

Databases
- BRENDA: enzyme data
- ExPASy: NiceZyme view
- KEGG: enzyme entry
- MetaCyc: metabolic pathway
- Rhea: reactions
- PDB structures: RCSB PDB PDBe PDBsum
Search
- PMC: articles
- PubMed: articles
- NCBI: proteins

Flavocytochrome c sulfide dehydrogenase, flavin-binding

Identifiers
- Symbol: FCSD-flav_bind
- Pfam: PF09242
- InterPro: IPR015323
- SCOP2: 1fcd / SCOPe / SUPFAM
Available protein structures:
- PDB: IPR015323 PF09242 (ECOD; PDBsum)
- AlphaFold: IPR015323; PF09242

Flavocytochrome c sulfide dehydrogenase, also known as Sulfide-cytochrome-c reductase (flavocytochrome c) (EC 1.8.2.3), is an enzyme with systematic name hydrogen-sulfide:flavocytochrome c oxidoreductase. It is found in sulfur-oxidising bacteria such as the purple phototrophic bacteria Allochromatium vinosum. This enzyme catalyses the following chemical reaction:

hydrogen sulfide + 2 ferricytochrome c $\rightleftharpoons$ sulfur + 2 ferrocytochrome c + 2 H^{+}

These enzymes are heterodimers of a flavoprotein (fccB Q06530) and a diheme cytochrome (fccA; Q06529) that carry out hydrogen sulfide-dependent cytochrome C reduction. The diheme cytochrome folds into two domains, each of which resembles mitochondrial cytochrome c, with the two haem groups bound to the interior of the subunit. The flavoprotein subunit has a glutathione reductase-like fold consisting of a beta(3,4)-alpha(3) core, and an alpha+beta sandwich. The active site of the flavoprotein subunit contains a catalytically important disulfide bridge located above the pyrimidine portion of the flavin ring. The flavoprotein contains a C-terminal domain required for binding to flavin, and subsequent electron transfer. Electrons are transferred from the flavin to one of the haem groups in the cytochrome. Both FAD and heme C are covalently bound to the protein.
