= Charles Alexander MacMunn =

Irish doctor (1852–1911)

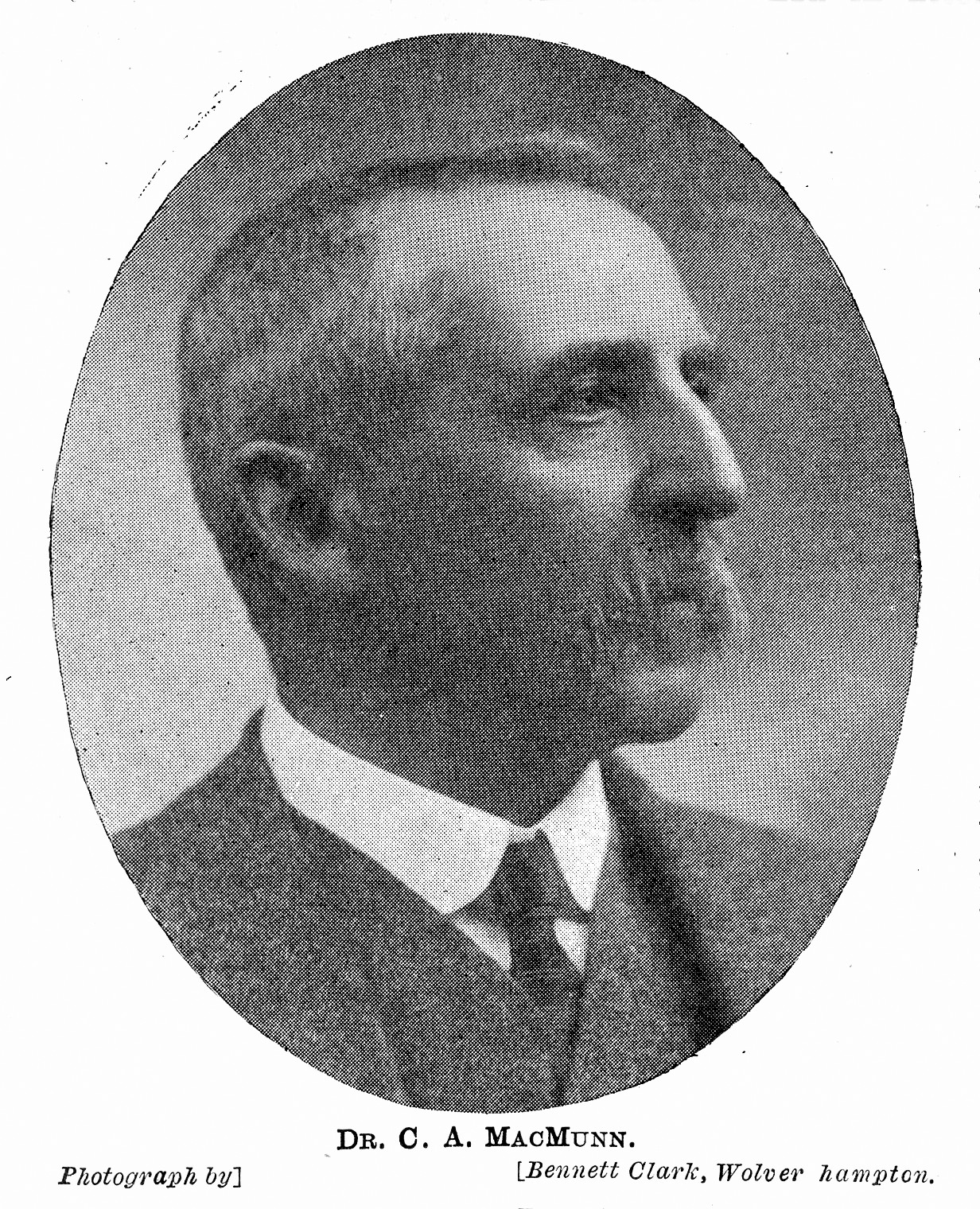
- Born: Easkey
- Education: Trinity College Dublin
- Medical career
- Profession: Doctor
- Institutions: General Hospital Wolverhampton
- Awards: Queens South Africa medal with three clasps

Dr Charles Alexander MacMunn (11 April 1852 – 18 February 1911) was the first to describe the respiratory pigment in blood, known today as Cytochrome1. It was one of the most significant discoveries made by an Irish doctor.

== Biography ==
MacMunn was born on 11 April 1852 in Easkey, County Sligo, Ireland, the son of James MacMunn MD.

He was educated at Trinity College Dublin, graduating BA with honours in 1871, MB in 1872, MD in 1875. He studied under William Stokes. He moved to Wolverhampton in 1873 to work within his cousin's practice, subsequently taking over the practice on his cousin's death. He had a loft of his stable converted to a laboratory work he could carry out work on his spectroscopy when not otherwise engaged with the practice.

He was the author of numerous papers on medicine, physiology and biology. His seminal paper was published in 1880 entitled "The Spectroscope in Medicine". He used the spectroscope to study pigments in microorganisms and muscular tissue. He was the first to describe cytochromes, which he termed myohaematins (respiratory pigments of muscle). Serious criticism of his work, led by German scientist Felix Hoppe-Seyler, led to it being discredited at the time. Over 40 years later, work by David Keilin using similar equipment vindicated MacMunnn's work. MacMunn was appointed Honorary Pathologist and Physician to the General Hospital Wolverhampton in 1889.

Following his difficulties in the vindication of his work MacMunn subsequently had a distinguished career as a Medical Officer in the military. His military career took him to South Africa, he was appointed Staff-Officer to the Royal Hospital Commissions during the Boer War. He was mentioned in dispatches and awarded the Queens South Africa medal with three clasps. During his time in South Africa, he contracted malaria. He retired in 1909, and ill health led to his death on 18 February 1911.

MacMunn was married twice, and had three children by his first wife.

In 2016, the Institute of Technology, Sligo named its new science building after MacMunn.
