= Α-O =

Reactive oxygen species

α-O
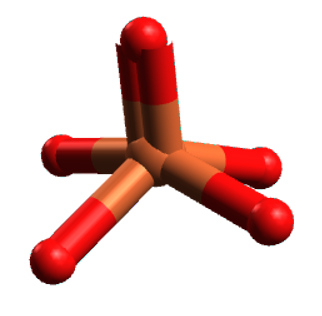
- Except where otherwise noted, data are given for materials in their standard state (at 25 °C [77 °F], 100 kPa). Infobox references

α-O (alpha-oxygen) is a reactive oxygen species formed from an oxygen-atom abstraction (OAT) from nitrous oxide (N_{2}O) by alpha-iron (α-Fe) catalysts. The latter is defined as a high spin (S=2) divalent iron(II) ion in a constrained square planar coordination with an accessible axial coordination position. The stabilization of α-O requires structural strain on the equatorial ligand field to maintain the reactive oxygen atom in the axial position and it is this forced geometry, similar to the 'entatic state' known in metalloproteins, that lies at the basis of its reactivity in inert C-H bond activation.

The alpha-oxygen site was first discovered and named in 1990 by researchers from the Boreskov Institute of Catalysis in the ZSM-5 zeolite, and was later described in detail by researchers from Stanford University and KU Leuven in the beta zeolite.

== See also ==
- Carbon–hydrogen bond activation
- Catalysis
