= Reverse electron flow =

Reverse electron flow (also known as reverse electron transport) is a mechanism in microbial metabolism. Chemolithotrophs using an electron donor with a higher redox potential than NAD(P)^{+}/NAD(P)H, such as nitrite or sulfur compounds, must use energy to reduce NAD(P)^{+}. This energy is supplied by consuming proton motive force to drive electrons in a reverse direction through an electron transport chain and is thus the reverse process as forward electron transport. In some cases, the energy consumed in reverse electron transport is five times greater than energy gained from the forward process. Autotrophs can use this process to supply reducing power for inorganic carbon fixation.

Reverse electron transfer (RET) is the process that can occur in respiring mitochondria, when a small fraction of electrons from reduced ubiquinol is driven upstream by the membrane potential towards mitochondrial complex I. This results in reduction of oxidized pyridine nucleotide (NAD^{+} or NADP^{+}). This is a reversal of the exergonic reaction of forward electron transfer in the mitochondrial complex I when electrons travel from NADH to ubiquinone.

== Mechanism ==
The term "Reverse electron transfer" is used in regard to the reversibility of the reaction performed by complex I of the mitochondrial or bacterial respiratory chain. Complex I is responsible for the oxidation of NADH generated in catabolism when in the forward reaction electrons from the nucleotide (NADH) are transferred to membrane ubiquinone and energy is saved in the form of proton-motive force. The reversibility of the electron transfer reactions at complex I was first discovered when Chance and Hollunger have shown that the addition of succinate to mitochondria in State 4 leads to an uncoupler-sensitive reduction of the intramitochondrial nucleotides (NAD(P)^{+}). When succinate is oxidized by intact mitochondria, complex I can catalyze reverse electron transfer when electrons from ubiquinol (QH_{2}, formed during oxidation of succinate) is driven by the proton-motive force to complex I flavin toward the nucleotide-binding site.

Since the discovery of the reverse electron transfer in the 1960s it was regarded as in vitro phenomenon, until the role of RET in the development of ischemia/reperfusion injury has been recognized in the brain and heart. During ischemia substantial amount of succinate is generated in cerebral or cardiac tissue and upon reperfusion it can be oxidized by mitochondria initiating reverse electron transfer reaction. Reverse electron transfer supports the highest rate of mitochondrial Reactive Oxygen Species (ROS) production, and complex I flavin mononucleotide (FMN) has been identified as the site where one-electron reduction of oxygen takes place.
