= Cytochrome b6f complex =

Enzyme

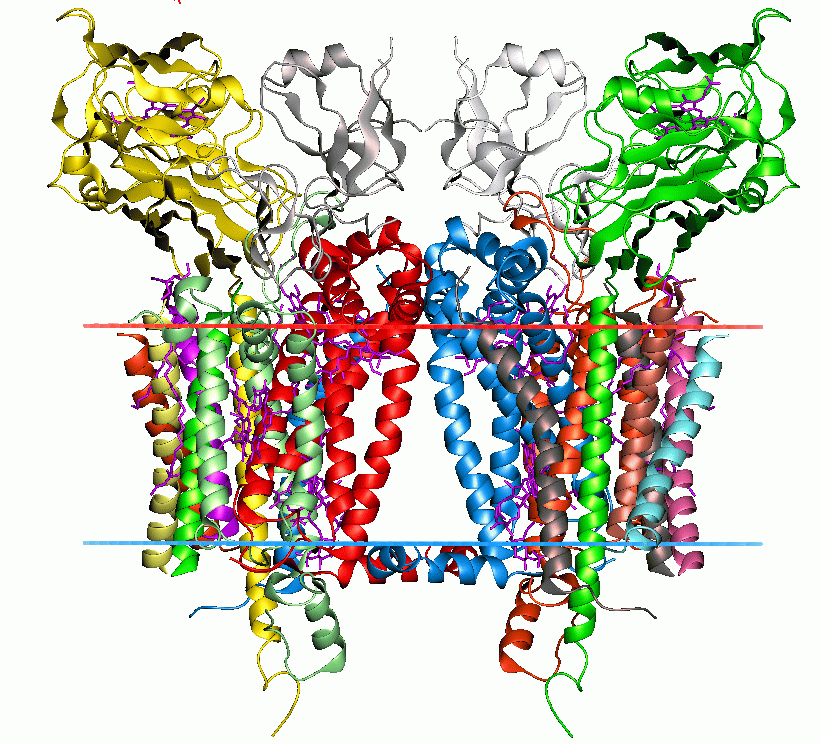
- Crystal structure of the cytochrome b6f complex from C. reinhardtii (1q90). Hydrocarbon boundaries of the lipid bilayer are shown by red and blue lines (thylakoid space side and stroma side, respectively).

Identifiers
- Symbol: B6F
- TCDB: 3.D.3
- OPM superfamily: 92
- OPM protein: 4pv1
- Membranome: 258

Cytochrome b_{6}f complex

Identifiers
- EC no.: 7.1.1.6
- CAS no.: 79079-13-3
- Alt. names: Plastoquinol/plastocyanin reductase

Databases
- IntEnz: IntEnz view
- BRENDA: BRENDA entry
- ExPASy: NiceZyme view
- KEGG: KEGG entry
- MetaCyc: metabolic pathway
- PRIAM: profile
- PDB structures: RCSB PDB PDBe PDBsum
Search
- PMC: articles
- PubMed: articles
- NCBI: proteins

The cytochrome b_{6}f complex (plastoquinol/plastocyanin reductase or plastoquinol/plastocyanin oxidoreductase; EC 7.1.1.6) is an enzyme found in the thylakoid membrane in chloroplasts of plants, cyanobacteria, and green algae, that catalyzes the transfer of electrons from plastoquinol to plastocyanin:

plastoquinol + 2 oxidized plastocyanin + 2 H^{+} [side 1] $\rightleftharpoons$ plastoquinone + 2 reduced plastocyanin + 4 H^{+} [side 2].

The reaction is analogous to the reaction catalyzed by cytochrome bc_{1} (Complex III) of the mitochondrial electron transport chain. During photosynthesis, the cytochrome b_{6}f complex is one step along the chain that transfers electrons from Photosystem II to Photosystem I, and at the same time pumps protons into the thylakoid space, contributing to the generation of an electrochemical (energy) gradient that is later used to synthesize ATP from ADP.

== Enzyme structure ==
The cytochrome b_{6}f complex is a dimer, with each monomer composed of eight subunits. These consist of four large subunits: a 32 kDa cytochrome f with a c-type cytochrome, a 25 kDa cytochrome b_{6} with a low- and high-potential heme group, a 19 kDa Rieske iron-sulfur protein containing a [2Fe-2S] cluster, and a 17 kDa subunit IV; along with four small subunits (3-4 kDa): PetG, PetL, PetM, and PetN. The total molecular weight is 217 kDa.

The crystal structures of cytochrome b_{6}f complexes from Chlamydomonas reinhardtii, Mastigocladus laminosus, and Nostoc sp. PCC 7120 have been determined.

The core of the complex is structurally similar to the cytochrome bc_{1} core. Cytochrome b_{6} and subunit IV are homologous to cytochrome b, and the Rieske iron-sulfur proteins of the two complexes are homologous. However, cytochrome f and cytochrome c_{1} are not homologous.

Cytochrome b_{6}f contains seven prosthetic groups. Four are found in both cytochrome b_{6}f and bc_{1}: the c-type heme of cytochrome c_{1} and f, the two b-type hemes (b_{p} and b_{n}) in bc_{1} and b_{6}f, and the [2Fe-2S] cluster of the Rieske protein. Three unique prosthetic groups are found in cytochrome b_{6}f: chlorophyll a, β-carotene, and heme c_{n} (also known as heme x).

The inter-monomer space within the core of the cytochrome b6f complex dimer is occupied by lipids, which provides directionality to heme-heme electron transfer through modulation of the intra-protein dielectric environment.

Cytochrome b6-f complex subunit 6 (PetL)

Identifiers
- Symbol: ?
- Pfam: PF05115
- InterPro: IPR007802
Available protein structures:
- Pfam: structures / ECOD
- PDB: RCSB PDB; PDBe; PDBj
- PDBsum: structure summary

== Biological function ==
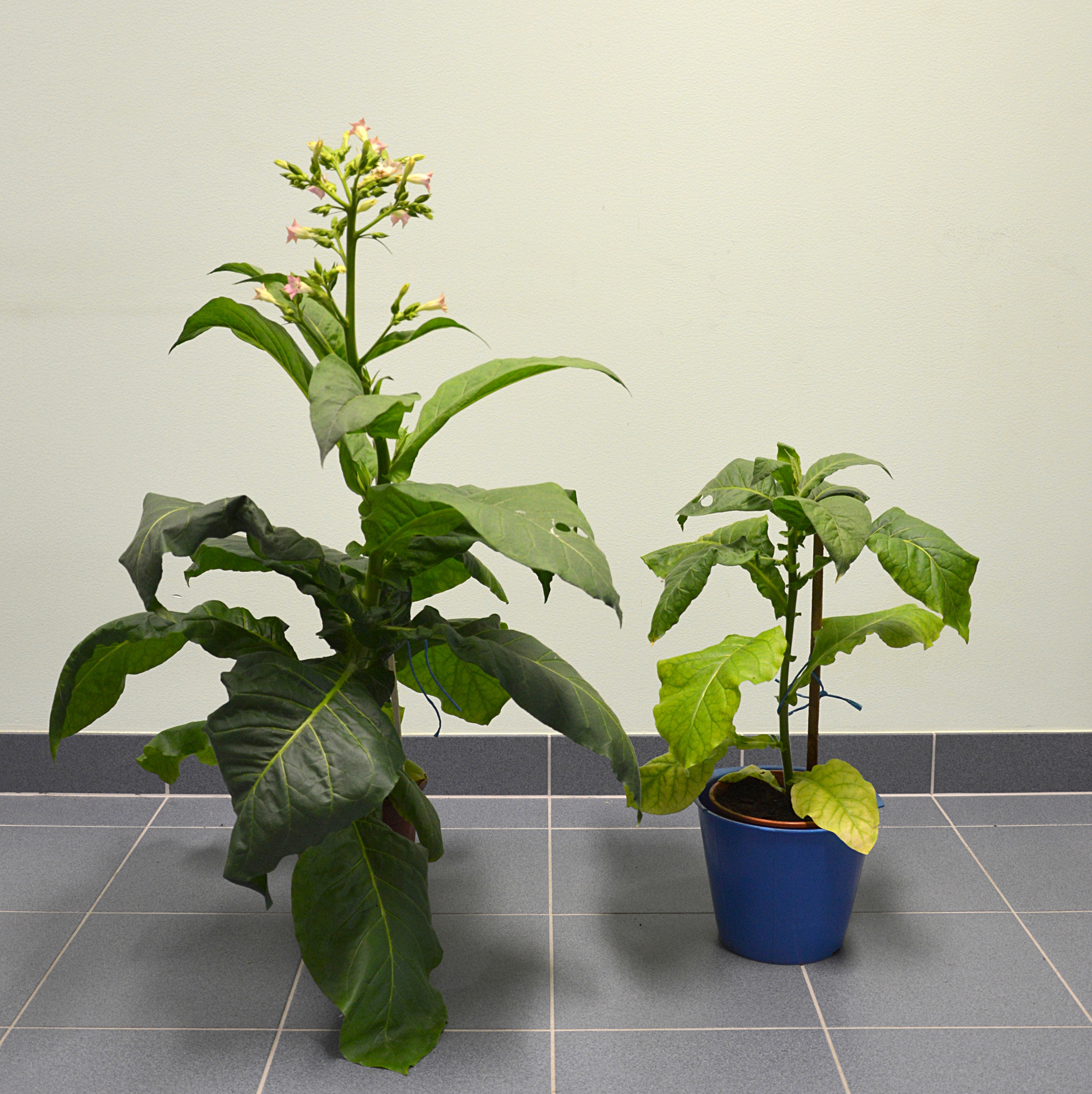
Tobacco (Nicotiana tabacum) cytochrome b_{6}f mutant (right) next to normal plant. Plants are used in photosynthesis research to investigate the cyclic photophosphorylation.

In photosynthesis, the cytochrome b_{6}f complex functions to mediate the transfer of electrons and of energy between the two photosynthetic reaction center complexes, Photosystem II and Photosystem I, while transferring protons from the chloroplast stroma across the thylakoid membrane into the lumen. Electron transport via cytochrome b_{6}f is responsible for creating the proton gradient that drives the synthesis of ATP in chloroplasts.

In a separate reaction, the cytochrome b_{6}f complex plays a central role in cyclic photophosphorylation, when NADP^{+} is not available to accept electrons from reduced ferredoxin. This cycle, driven by the energy of P700^{+}, contributes to the creation of a proton gradient that can be used to drive ATP synthesis. It has been shown that this cycle is essential for photosynthesis, helping to maintain the proper ratio of ATP/NADPH production for carbon fixation.

The p-side quinol deprotonation-oxidation reactions within the cytochrome b6f complex have been implicated in the generation of reactive oxygen species. An integral chlorophyll molecule located within the quinol oxidation site has been suggested to perform a structural, non-photochemical function in enhancing the rate of formation of the reactive oxygen species, possibly to provide a redox-pathway for intra-cellular communication.

== Reaction mechanism ==
The cytochrome b_{6}f complex is responsible for "non-cyclic" (1) and "cyclic" (2) electron transfer between two mobile redox carriers, plastoquinol (QH_{2}) and plastocyanin (Pc):

H_{2}O	→	photosystem II	→	QH_{2}	→	Cyt b_{6}f	→	Pc	→	photosystem I	→	NADPH	(1)
				QH_{2}	→	Cyt b_{6}f	→	Pc	→	photosystem I	→	Q	(2)

Cytochrome b_{6}f catalyzes the transfer of electrons from plastoquinol to plastocyanin, while pumping two protons from the stroma into the thylakoid lumen:

QH_{2} + 2Pc(Cu^{2+}) + 2H^{+} (stroma) → Q + 2Pc(Cu^{+}) + 4H^{+} (lumen)

This reaction occurs through the Q cycle as in Complex III. Plastoquinol acts as the electron carrier, transferring its two electrons to high- and low-potential electron transport chains (ETC) via a mechanism called electron bifurcation. The complex contains up to three plastoquinone molecules that form an electron transfer network that are responsible for the operation of the Q cycle and its redox-sensing and catalytic functions in photosynthesis.

=== Q cycle ===
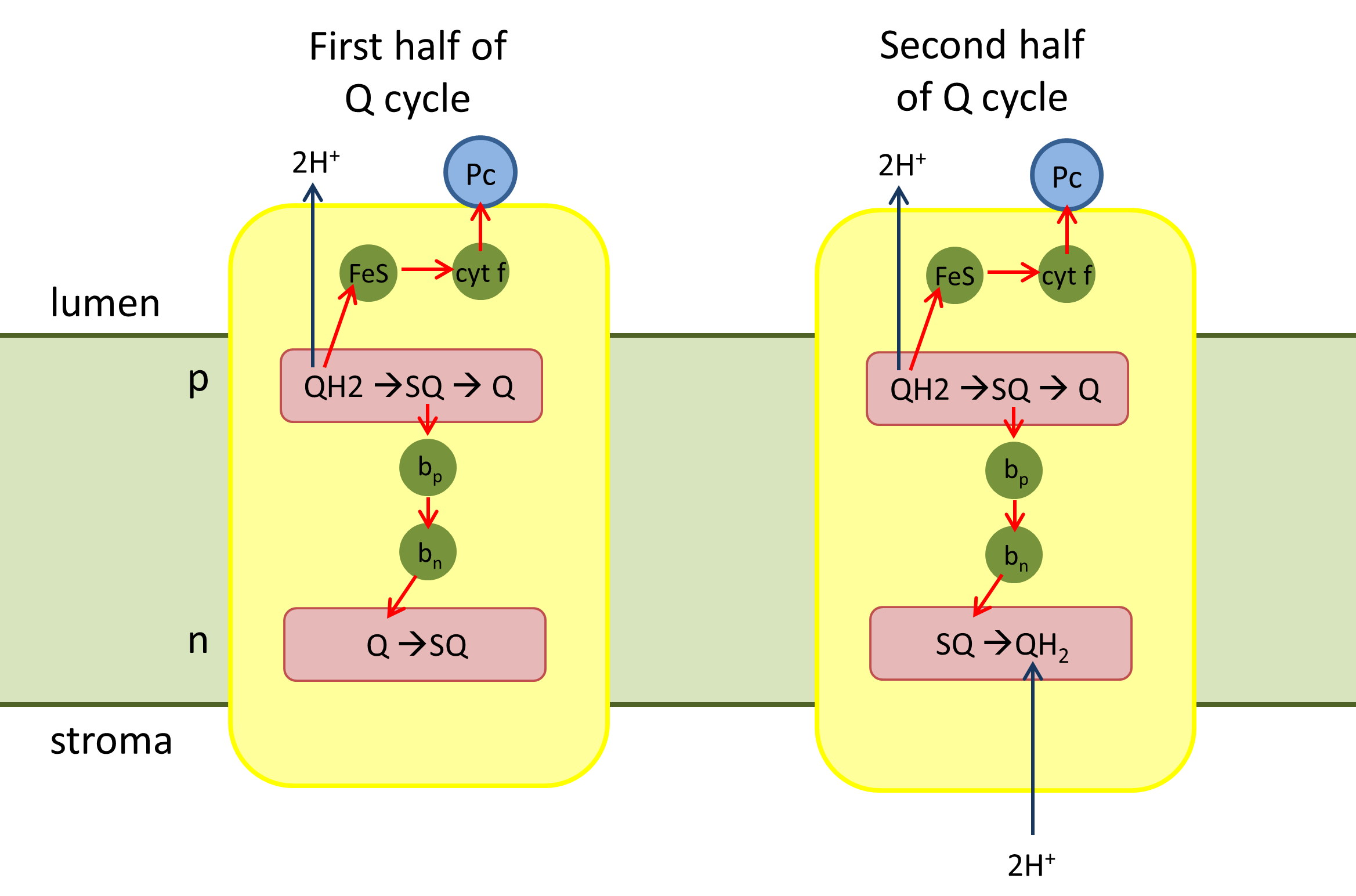
Q cycle of cytochrome b_{6}f

First half of Q cycle

1. QH_{2} binds to the positive 'p' side (lumen side) of the complex. It is oxidized to a semiquinone (SQ) by the iron-sulfur center (high-potential ETC) and releases two protons to the thylakoid lumen.
2. The reduced iron-sulfur center transfers its electron through cytochrome f to Pc.
3. In the low-potential ETC, SQ transfers its electron to heme b_{p} of cytochrome b6.
4. Heme b_{p} then transfers the electron to heme b_{n}.
5. Heme b_{n} reduces Q with one electron to form SQ.

Second half of Q cycle

1. A second QH_{2} binds to the complex.
2. In the high-potential ETC, one electron reduces another oxidized Pc.
3. In the low-potential ETC, the electron from heme b_{n} is transferred to SQ, and the completely reduced Q^{2−} takes up two protons from the stroma to form QH_{2}.
4. The oxidized Q and the reduced QH_{2} that has been regenerated diffuse into the membrane.

=== Cyclic electron transfer ===
Unlike Complex III, cytochrome b_{6}f catalyzes another electron transfer reaction that is central to cyclic photophosphorylation. The electron from ferredoxin (Fd) is transferred to plastoquinone and then the cytochrome b_{6}f complex to reduce plastocyanin, which is reoxidized by P700 in Photosystem I. The exact mechanism of the reduction of plastoquinone by ferredoxin is still under investigation. One proposal is that there exists a ferredoxin:plastoquinone-reductase or an NADP dehydrogenase. Since heme x does not appear to be required for the Q cycle and is not found in Complex III, it has been proposed that it is used for cyclic photophosphorylation by the following mechanism:

1. Fd (red) + heme x (ox) → Fd (ox) + heme x (red)
2. heme x (red) + Fd (red) + Q + 2H^{+} → heme x (ox) + Fd (ox) + QH_{2}
