= Electron bifurcation =

Biochemical redox process involving the transfer of 2 electrons

In biochemistry, electron bifurcation (EB) refers to a system that enables an unfavorable (endergonic) transformation by coupling to a favorable (exergonic) transformation. Two electrons are involved: one flows to an acceptor with a "higher reduction potential and the other with a lower reduction potential" than the donor. The process is suspected of being common in bioenergetics.

Two versions of EB are recognized. One involves redox of quinones and the other involves flavins. Quinones and flavins are cofactors that are capable of undergoing 2 e^{−} – 2 proton redox.

A pervasive example of electron bifurcation is the Q cycle, which is part of the machinery that results in oxidative phosphorylation. In that case one electron from ubiquinol is directed to a Rieske cluster and the other electron is directed to a cytochrome b.
