= Electron transport chain =

Energy-producing metabolic pathway

An electron transport chain (ETC) is a series of protein complexes and other molecules which transfer electrons from electron donors to electron acceptors via redox reactions (both reduction and oxidation occurring simultaneously) and couples this electron transfer with the transfer of protons (H^{+} ions) across a membrane. Many of the enzymes in the electron transport chain are embedded within the membrane.

The flow of electrons through the electron transport chain is an exergonic process. The energy from the redox reactions creates an electrochemical proton gradient that drives the synthesis of adenosine triphosphate (ATP). In aerobic respiration, the flow of electrons terminates with molecular oxygen as the final electron acceptor. In anaerobic respiration, other electron acceptors are used, such as sulfate.

In an electron transport chain, the redox reactions are driven by the difference in the Gibbs free energy of reactants and products. The free energy released when a higher-energy electron donor and acceptor convert to lower-energy products, while electrons are transferred from a lower to a higher redox potential, is used by the complexes in the electron transport chain to create an electrochemical gradient of ions. It is this electrochemical gradient that drives the synthesis of ATP via coupling with oxidative phosphorylation through ATP synthase.

In eukaryotic organisms, the electron transport chain, and site of oxidative phosphorylation, is found on the inner mitochondrial membrane. The energy released by reactions of oxygen and reduced compounds such as cytochrome c and (indirectly) NADH and FADH_{2} is used by the electron transport chain to pump protons into the intermembrane space, generating the electrochemical gradient over the inner mitochondrial membrane. In photosynthetic eukaryotes, the electron transport chain is found on the thylakoid membrane. Here, light energy drives electron transport through a proton pump and the resulting proton gradient causes subsequent synthesis of ATP. In bacteria, the electron transport chain can vary between species but it always constitutes a set of redox reactions that are coupled to the synthesis of ATP through the generation of an electrochemical gradient and oxidative phosphorylation through ATP synthase.

== Mitochondrial electron transport chains ==
The electron transport chain in the mitochondrion is the site of oxidative phosphorylation in eukaryotes. It mediates the reaction between NADH or succinate generated in the citric acid cycle and oxygen to power ATP synthase.

Most eukaryotic cells have mitochondria, which produce ATP from reactions of oxygen with products of the citric acid cycle, fatty acid metabolism, and amino acid metabolism. At the inner mitochondrial membrane, electrons from NADH and FADH_{2} pass through the electron transport chain to oxygen, which provides the energy driving the process as it is reduced to water. The electron transport chain comprises an enzymatic series of electron donors and acceptors. Each electron donor will pass electrons to an acceptor of higher redox potential, which in turn donates these electrons to another acceptor, a process that continues down the series until electrons are passed to oxygen, the terminal electron acceptor in the chain. Each reaction releases energy because a higher-energy donor and acceptor convert to lower-energy products. Via the transferred electrons, this energy is used to generate a proton gradient across the mitochondrial membrane by "pumping" protons into the intermembrane space, producing a state of higher free energy that has the potential to do work. This entire process is called oxidative phosphorylation since ADP is phosphorylated to ATP by using the electrochemical gradient that the redox reactions of the electron transport chain have established driven by energy-releasing reactions of oxygen.

=== Mitochondrial redox carriers ===
Energy associated with the transfer of electrons down the electron transport chain is used to pump protons from the mitochondrial matrix into the intermembrane space, creating an electrochemical proton gradient (ΔpH) across the inner mitochondrial membrane. This proton gradient is largely but not exclusively responsible for the mitochondrial membrane potential (ΔΨ_{M}). It allows ATP synthase to use the flow of H^{+} through the enzyme back into the matrix to generate ATP from adenosine diphosphate (ADP) and inorganic phosphate. Complex I (NADH coenzyme Q reductase; labeled I) accepts electrons from the Krebs cycle electron carrier nicotinamide adenine dinucleotide (NADH), and passes them to coenzyme Q (ubiquinone; labeled Q), which also receives electrons from Complex II (succinate dehydrogenase; labeled II). Q passes electrons to Complex III (cytochrome bc_{1} complex; labeled III), which passes them to cytochrome c (cyt c). Cyt c passes electrons to Complex IV (cytochrome c oxidase; labeled IV).

Four membrane-bound complexes have been identified in mitochondria. Each is an extremely complex transmembrane structure that is embedded in the inner membrane. Three of them are proton pumps. The structures are electrically connected by lipid-soluble electron carriers and water-soluble electron carriers. The overall electron transport chain can be summarized as follows:

==== Complex I ====
In Complex I (NADH ubiquinone oxidoreductase, Type I NADH dehydrogenase, or mitochondrial complex I; EC 7.1.1.2), two electrons are removed from NADH and transferred to a lipid-soluble carrier, ubiquinone (Q). The reduced product, ubiquinol (QH_{2}), freely diffuses within the membrane, and Complex I translocates four protons (H^{+}) across the membrane, thus producing a proton gradient. Complex I is one of the main sites at which premature electron leakage to oxygen occurs, thus being one of the main sites of production of superoxide.

The pathway of electrons is as follows:

NADH is oxidized to NAD^{+}, by reducing flavin mononucleotide to FMNH_{2} in one two-electron step. FMNH_{2} is then oxidized in two one-electron steps, through a semiquinone intermediate. Each electron thus transfers from the FMNH_{2} to an Fe–S cluster, from the Fe-S cluster to ubiquinone (Q). Transfer of the first electron results in the free-radical (semiquinone) form of Q, and transfer of the second electron reduces the semiquinone form to the ubiquinol form, QH_{2}. During this process, four protons are translocated from the mitochondrial matrix to the intermembrane space. As the electrons move through the complex an electron current is produced along the 180 Angstrom width of the complex within the membrane. This current powers the active transport of four protons to the intermembrane space per two electrons from NADH.

==== Complex II ====
In Complex II (succinate dehydrogenase or succinate-CoQ reductase; EC 1.3.5.1) additional electrons are delivered into the quinone pool (Q) originating from succinate and transferred (via flavin adenine dinucleotide (FAD)) to Q. Complex II consists of four protein subunits: succinate dehydrogenase (SDHA); succinate dehydrogenase [ubiquinone] iron–sulfur subunit mitochondrial (SDHB); succinate dehydrogenase complex subunit C (SDHC); and succinate dehydrogenase complex subunit D (SDHD). Other electron donors (e.g., fatty acids and glycerol 3-phosphate) also direct electrons into Q (via FAD). Complex II is a parallel electron transport pathway to Complex I, but unlike Complex I, no protons are transported to the intermembrane space in this pathway. Therefore, the pathway through Complex II contributes less energy to the overall electron transport chain process.

==== Complex III ====
In Complex III (cytochrome bc_{1} complex or CoQH_{2}-cytochrome c reductase; EC 7.1.1.8), the Q-cycle contributes to the proton gradient by an asymmetric absorption/release of protons. Two electrons are removed from QH_{2} at the Q_{o} site and sequentially transferred to two molecules of cytochrome c, a water-soluble electron carrier located within the intermembrane space. The two other electrons sequentially pass across the protein to the Q_{i} site where the quinone part of ubiquinone is reduced to quinol. A proton gradient is formed by one quinol ($\ce{2H+2e-}$) oxidations at the Q_{o} site to form one quinone ($\ce{2H+2e-}$) at the Q_{i} site. (In total, four protons are translocated: two protons reduce quinone to quinol and two protons are released from two ubiquinol molecules.)

$\ce{QH2 + 2}$$\text{ cytochrome }c$$\ce{(Fe^{III}) + 2 H}$$^+_\text{in}$$\ce{-> Q + 2}$$\text{ cytochrome }c$$\ce{(Fe^{II}) + 4 H}$$^+_\text{out}$

When electron transfer is reduced (by a high membrane potential or respiratory inhibitors such as antimycin A), Complex III may leak electrons to molecular oxygen, resulting in superoxide formation.

This complex is inhibited by dimercaprol (British Anti-Lewisite, BAL), naphthoquinone and antimycin.

==== Complex IV ====
In Complex IV (cytochrome c oxidase; EC 7.1.1.9), sometimes called cytochrome AA3, four electrons are removed from four molecules of cytochrome c and transferred to molecular oxygen (O_{2}) and four protons, producing two molecules of water. The complex contains coordinated copper ions and several heme groups. At the same time, eight protons are removed from the mitochondrial matrix (although only four are translocated across the membrane), contributing to the proton gradient. The exact details of proton pumping in Complex IV are still under study. Cyanide is an inhibitor of Complex IV.

=== Coupling with oxidative phosphorylation ===
Depiction of ATP synthase, the site of oxidative phosphorylation to generate ATP.

According to the chemiosmotic coupling hypothesis, proposed by Nobel Prize in Chemistry winner Peter D. Mitchell, the electron transport chain and oxidative phosphorylation are coupled by a proton gradient across the inner mitochondrial membrane. The efflux of protons from the mitochondrial matrix creates an electrochemical gradient (proton gradient). This gradient is used by the F_{O}F_{1} ATP-synthase complex to make ATP via oxidative phosphorylation. ATP-synthase is sometimes described as Complex V of the electron transport chain.

The F_{O} component acts as a channel that harnesses the proton flow to drive rotation. It is composed of a, b and c subunits. Protons in the inter-membrane space of mitochondria first enter the ATP-synthase complex through an a subunit channel. Then protons bind to the c subunits, which are oriented in a ring (the c-ring), where the number of c subunits determines how many protons are required to make the c-ring and the attached γ-rotor turn one full revolution. There are 8 c subunits in humans, thus 8 protons are required. Protons are released as a result of the rotation of the c-ring, being directed into the mitochondrial matrix along the a subunit channels. This proton reflux drives the mechanical rotation of the c-ring and the γ-axle. The rotation of the γ-rotor causes the sequential alternation of conformational states in the catalytic β-subunits in F_{1}.

There are three different conformational states, which are:

- Open, in this state the β-subunit has low affinity to ligands, releasing the previously synthesized ATP molecule.
- Loose, Binds ADP and P_{i} together loosely.
- Tight, Binds ADP and P_{i} so tightly that it catalyzes the condensation reaction to form ATP.

This cycle is known as the binding change mechanism (coined by Paul D. Boyer), explaining the conversion of mechanical rotation to chemical energy.

Coupling with oxidative phosphorylation is a key step for ATP production. However, in specific cases, uncoupling the two processes may be biologically useful. The uncoupling protein, thermogenin—present in the inner mitochondrial membrane of brown adipose tissue—provides for an alternative flow of protons back to the inner mitochondrial matrix. Thyroxine is also a natural uncoupler. This alternative flow results in thermogenesis rather than ATP production.

=== Reverse electron flow ===
Reverse electron flow is the transfer of electrons through the electron transport chain through the reverse redox reactions. Usually requiring a significant amount of energy to be used, this can reduce the oxidized forms of electron donors. For example, NAD^{+} can be reduced to NADH by Complex I. There are several factors that have been shown to induce reverse electron flow. However, more work needs to be done to confirm this. One example is blockage of ATP synthase, resulting in a build-up of protons and therefore a higher proton-motive force, inducing reverse electron flow.

== Photosynthesis ==
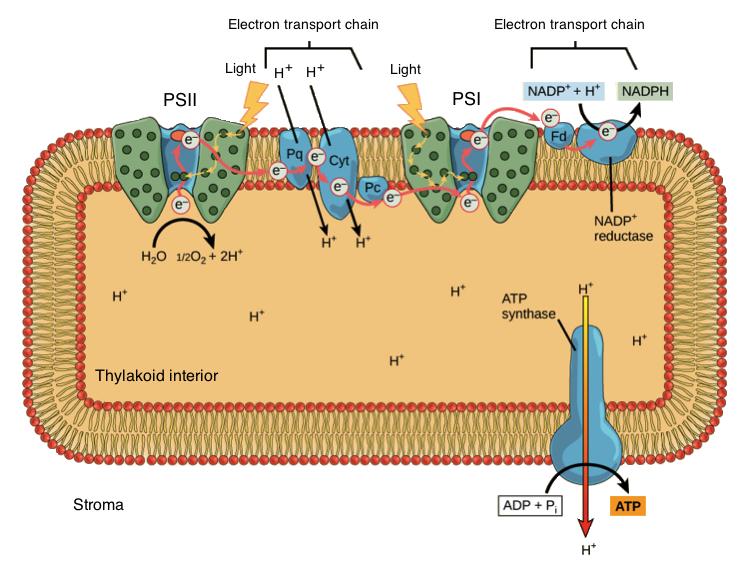
Photosynthetic electron transport chain of the thylakoid membrane.

In oxidative phosphorylation, electrons are transferred from an electron donor such as NADH to an acceptor such as O_{2} through an electron transport chain, releasing energy. In photophosphorylation, the energy of sunlight is used to create a high-energy electron donor which can subsequently reduce oxidized components and couple to ATP synthesis via proton translocation by the electron transport chain.

Photosynthetic electron transport chains, like the mitochondrial chain, can be considered as a special case of the bacterial systems. They use mobile, lipid-soluble quinone carriers (phylloquinone and plastoquinone) and mobile, water-soluble carriers (cytochromes). They also contain a proton pump. The proton pump in all photosynthetic chains resembles mitochondrial Complex III. The commonly held theory of symbiogenesis proposes that both organelles descended from bacteria.

== Prokaryotic electron transport chains ==
In eukaryotes, NADH is the most important electron donor. The associated electron transport chain is NADH → Complex I → Q → Complex III → cytochrome c → Complex IV → O_{2} where Complexes I, III and IV are proton pumps, while Q and cytochrome c are mobile electron carriers. The electron acceptor for this process is molecular oxygen. In prokaryotes (bacteria and archaea) the situation is more complicated, because there are several different electron donors and several different electron acceptors.

The generalized electron transport chain in bacteria is:

Electrons can enter the chain at three levels: at the level of a dehydrogenase, at the level of the quinone pool, or at the level of a mobile cytochrome electron carrier. These levels correspond to successively more positive redox potentials, or to successively decreased potential differences relative to the terminal electron acceptor. In other words, they correspond to successively smaller Gibbs free energy changes for the overall redox reaction.

Individual bacteria use multiple electron transport chains, often simultaneously. Bacteria can use a number of different electron donors, a number of different dehydrogenases, a number of different oxidases and reductases, and a number of different electron acceptors. For example, E. coli (when growing aerobically using glucose and oxygen as an energy source) uses two different NADH dehydrogenases and two different quinol oxidases, for a total of four different electron transport chains operating simultaneously.

A common feature of all electron transport chains is the presence of a proton pump to create an electrochemical gradient over a membrane. Bacterial electron transport chains may contain as many as three proton pumps, like mitochondria, or they may contain two or at least one.

=== Electron donors ===
In the current biosphere, the most common electron donors are organic molecules. Organisms that use organic molecules as an electron source are called organotrophs. Chemoorganotrophs (animals, fungi, protists) and photolithotrophs (plants and algae) constitute the vast majority of all familiar life forms.

Some prokaryotes can use inorganic matter as an electron source. Such an organism is called a (chemo)lithotroph ("rock-eater"). Inorganic electron donors include hydrogen, carbon monoxide, ammonia, nitrite, sulfur, sulfide, manganese oxide, and ferrous iron. Lithotrophs have been found growing in rock formations thousands of meters below the surface of Earth. Because of their volume of distribution, lithotrophs may actually outnumber organotrophs and phototrophs in our biosphere.

The use of inorganic electron donors such as hydrogen as an energy source is of particular interest in the study of evolution. This type of metabolism must logically have preceded the use of organic molecules and oxygen as an energy source.

Comparison of different energy source in bacteria
	Chemoorganotroph	Chemolithotrophs	Phototrophs	
	Chemoorganotroph	Chemolithotrophs	Photosynthesis	Respiration
Model bacteria	Escherichia coli	Paracoccus denitrificans	Cyanobacteria	
Energy source	Organic compounds	Inorganic/C1 compounds	Light	Intracellular C
Electron donors	NADH, succinate, lactate, and malate	Inorganic/C1 compounds and NADH	Water	NAD(P)H
Proton motive force (H^{+}/e^{-})	1–4	≤5	3	1–5
Energy efficiency strategy	Low	High	Low	
Pathway flux strategy	High	Low	High	
Ecological implication	Fast growth in plentiful resource; Improved conservation in limited energy	Slow growth rate; Symbiotic organism for resource; Adaptation in oligotrophic situation	Integrated photosynthesis–respiration; Main primary producer in oligotrophic situation	

==== Dehydrogenases: equivalents to complexes I and II ====
Bacteria can use several different electron donors. When organic matter is the electron source, the donor may be NADH or succinate, in which case electrons enter the electron transport chain via NADH dehydrogenase (similar to Complex I in mitochondria) or succinate dehydrogenase (similar to Complex II). Other dehydrogenases may be used to process different energy sources: formate dehydrogenase, lactate dehydrogenase, glyceraldehyde-3-phosphate dehydrogenase, H_{2} dehydrogenase (hydrogenase), electron transport chain. Some dehydrogenases are also proton pumps, while others funnel electrons into the quinone pool. Most dehydrogenases show induced expression in the bacterial cell in response to metabolic needs triggered by the environment in which the cells grow. In the case of lactate dehydrogenase in E. coli, the enzyme is used aerobically and in combination with other dehydrogenases. It is inducible and is expressed when the concentration of DL-lactate in the cell is high.

=== Quinone carriers ===
Quinones are mobile, lipid-soluble carriers that shuttle electrons (and protons) between large, relatively immobile macromolecular complexes embedded in the membrane. Bacteria use ubiquinone (Coenzyme Q, the same quinone that mitochondria use) and related quinones such as menaquinone (Vitamin K_{2}). Archaea in the genus Sulfolobus use caldariellaquinone. The use of different quinones is due to slight changes in redox potentials caused by changes in structure. The change in redox potentials of these quinones may be suited to changes in the electron acceptors or variations of redox potentials in bacterial complexes.

=== Proton pumps ===
A proton pump is any process that creates a proton gradient across a membrane. Protons can be physically moved across a membrane, as seen in mitochondrial Complexes I and IV. The same effect can be produced by moving electrons in the opposite direction. The result is the disappearance of a proton from the cytoplasm and the appearance of a proton in the periplasm. Mitochondrial Complex III is this second type of proton pump, which is mediated by a quinone (the Q cycle).

Some dehydrogenases are proton pumps, while others are not. Most oxidases and reductases are proton pumps, but some are not. Cytochrome bc_{1} is a proton pump found in many, but not all, bacteria (not in E. coli). As the name implies, bacterial bc_{1} is similar to mitochondrial bc_{1} (Complex III).

=== Cytochrome electron carriers ===
Cytochromes are proteins that contain iron. They are found in two very different environments.

Some cytochromes are water-soluble carriers that shuttle electrons to and from large, immobile macromolecular structures imbedded in the membrane. The mobile cytochrome electron carrier in mitochondria is cytochrome c. Bacteria use a number of different mobile cytochrome electron carriers.

Other cytochromes are found within macromolecules such as Complex III and Complex IV. They also function as electron carriers, but in a very different, intramolecular, solid-state environment.

Electrons may enter an electron transport chain at the level of a mobile cytochrome or quinone carrier. For example, electrons from inorganic electron donors (nitrite, ferrous iron, electron transport chain) enter the electron transport chain at the cytochrome level. When electrons enter at a redox level greater than NADH, the electron transport chain must operate in reverse to produce this necessary, higher-energy molecule.

It has been observed that inter-protein electron transport between cytochromes c and c_{1} (complex III) depends on pH and the presence of oxygen, suggesting that protons and superoxide may act as redox mediators in the long-distance electron transport process through the aqueous solution.

=== Electron acceptors and terminal oxidase/reductase ===
As there are a number of different electron donors (organic matter in organotrophs, inorganic matter in lithotrophs), there are a number of different electron acceptors, both organic and inorganic. As with other steps of the ETC, an enzyme is required to help with the process.

If oxygen is available, it is most often used as the terminal electron acceptor in aerobic bacteria and facultative anaerobes. An oxidase reduces the O_{2} to water while oxidizing something else. In mitochondria, the terminal membrane complex (Complex IV) is cytochrome oxidase, which oxidizes the cytochrome. Aerobic bacteria use a number of different terminal oxidases. For example, E. coli (a facultative anaerobe) does not have a cytochrome oxidase or a bc_{1} complex. Under aerobic conditions, it uses two different terminal quinol oxidases (both proton pumps) to reduce oxygen to water.

Bacterial terminal oxidases can be split into classes according to the molecules act as terminal electron acceptors. Class I oxidases are cytochrome oxidases and use oxygen as the terminal electron acceptor. Class II oxidases are quinol oxidases and can use a variety of terminal electron acceptors. Both of these classes can be subdivided into categories based on what redox-active components they contain. E.g. Heme aa3 Class 1 terminal oxidases are much more efficient than Class 2 terminal oxidases.

Mostly in anaerobic environments different electron acceptors are used, including nitrate, nitrite, ferric iron, sulfate, carbon dioxide, and small organic molecules such as fumarate. When bacteria grow in anaerobic environments, the terminal electron acceptor is reduced by an enzyme called a reductase. E. coli can use fumarate reductase, nitrate reductase, nitrite reductase, DMSO reductase, or trimethylamine-N-oxide reductase, depending on the availability of these acceptors in the environment.

Most terminal oxidases and reductases are inducible. They are synthesized by the organism as needed, in response to specific environmental conditions.

== See also ==
- Charge-transfer complex
- CoRR hypothesis
- Electron equivalent
- Hydrogen hypothesis
- Respirasome
- Electric bacteria
