= Plastocyanin =

Electron transfer protein

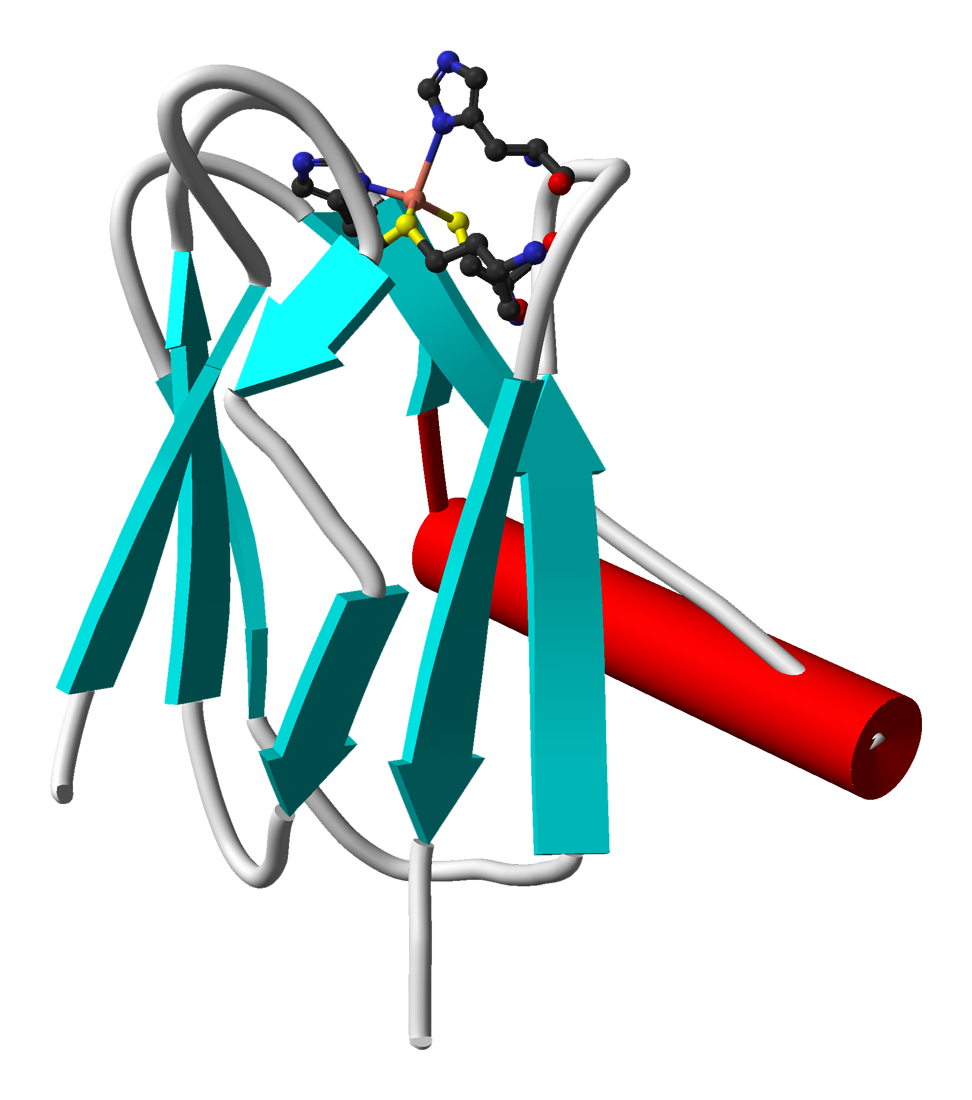
- Phormidium laminosum plastocyanin, PDB: 3BQV.

Identifiers
- Symbol: Plastocyanin
- InterPro: IPR002387
- CATH: 3BQV
- SCOP2: 3BQV / SCOPe / SUPFAM
- CDD: cd04219
Available protein structures:
- PDB: IPR002387
- AlphaFold: IPR002387

Plastocyanin is a copper-containing protein that mediates electron-transfer. It is found in a variety of plants, where it participates in the light-dependent reactions of photosynthesis. The protein is a prototype of the blue copper proteins, a family of intensely blue-colored metalloproteins. Specifically, it falls into the group of small type I blue copper proteins called "cupredoxins".

== Function ==
In photosynthesis, plastocyanin transfers an electron from the cytochrome f of the cytochrome b_{6}f complex, to the P700+ from photosystem I. Cytochrome b_{6}f complex and photosystem I are both membrane-bound proteins with residues exposed on the thylakoid lumen. Cytochrome f acts as an electron donor, while P700+ accepts electrons from reduced plastocyanin.

== Structure ==
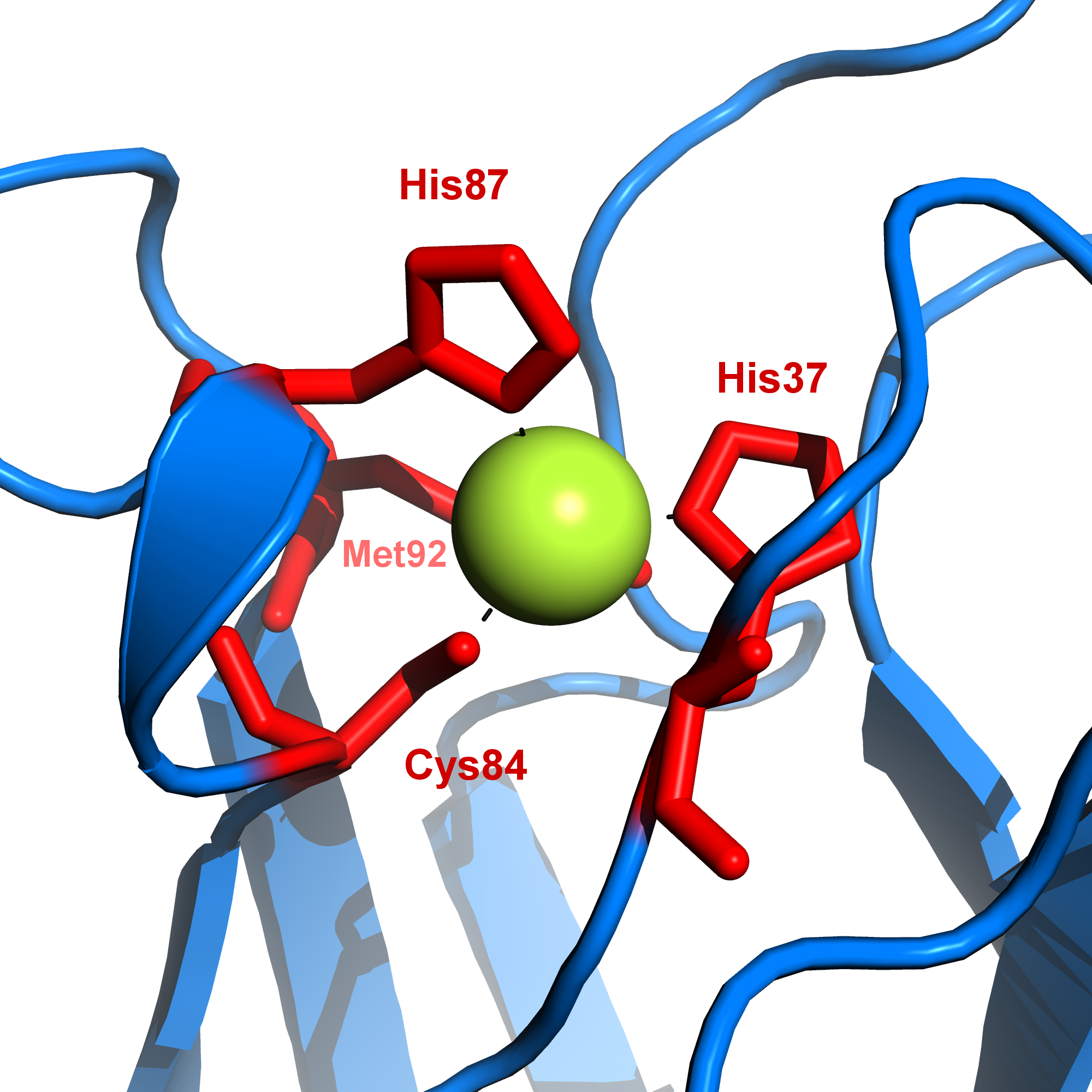
The copper site in plastocyanin, with the four amino acids that bind the metal labelled.

Plastocyanin was the first of the blue copper proteins to be characterised by X-ray crystallography. It features an eight-stranded antiparallel β-barrel containing one copper center.

Structures of the protein from poplar, algae, parsley, spinach, and French bean plants have been characterized crystallographically. In all cases, the binding site is generally conserved. Bound to the copper center are four ligands: the imidazole groups of two histidine residues (His37 and His87), the thiolate of Cys84, and the thioether of Met92. The geometry of the copper binding site is described as a ‘distorted tetrahedral’. The Cu-S (Cys) contact is much shorter (207 picometers) than Cu-S (Met) (282 pm) bond. The elongated Cu-thioether bond appears to destabilise the Cu^{II} state, thereby enhancing its oxidizing power. The blue colour (597 nm peak absorption) is assigned to a charge transfer transition from S_{pπ} to Cu_{dx^{2}-y^{2}}.

In the reduced form of plastocyanin, His-87 becomes protonated.

While the molecular surface of the protein near the copper binding site varies slightly, all plastocyanins have a hydrophobic surface surrounding the exposed histidine of the copper binding site. In plant plastocyanins, acidic residues are located on either side of the highly conserved tyrosine-83. Algal plastocyanins, and those from vascular plants in the family Apiaceae, contain similar acidic residues, but are shaped differently from those of plant plastocyanins – they lack residues 57 and 58. In cyanobacteria, the distribution of charged residues on the surface is different from eukaryotic plastocyanins, and variations among different bacterial species is large. Many cyanobacterial plastocyanins have 107 amino acids. Although the acidic patches are not conserved in bacteria, the hydrophobic patch is always present. These hydrophobic and acidic patches are believed to be the recognition/binding sites for the other proteins involved in electron transfer.

== Reactions ==
Plastocyanin (Cu^{2+}Pc) is reduced (an electron is added) by cytochrome f according to the following reaction:

Cu^{2+}Pc + e^{−} → Cu^{+}Pc

After dissociation, Cu^{+}Pc diffuses through the lumen space until recognition/binding occurs with P700^{+}, at which point P700^{+} oxidizes Cu^{+}Pc according to the following reaction:

Cu^{+}Pc → Cu^{2+}Pc + e^{−}

The redox potential is about 370 mV and the isoelectric pH is about 4.

== Entatic state ==
A catalyst's function is to increase the speed of the electron transfer (redox) reaction. Plastocyanin is believed to work less like an enzyme where enzymes decrease the transition energy needed to transfer the electron. Plastocyanin works more on the principles of entatic states where it increases the energy of the reactants, decreasing the amount of energy needed for the redox reaction to occur. Another way to rephrase the function of plastocyanin is that it can facilitate the electron transfer reaction by providing a small reorganization energy, which has been measured to about 16–28 kcal/mol (67–117 kJ/mol).

== In the ocean ==
Usually, plastocyanin can be found in organisms that contain chlorophyll b and cyanobacteria, as well as algae that contain chlorophyll c. Plastocyanin has also been found in the diatom, Thalassiosira oceanica, which can be found in oceanic environments. It was surprising to find these organisms containing the protein plastocyanin because the concentration of copper dissolved in the ocean is usually low (between 0.4 – 50 nM). However, the concentration of copper in the oceans is comparatively higher compared to the concentrations of other metals such as zinc and iron. Other organisms that live in the ocean, such as other phytoplankton species, have adapted to where they do not need as high of concentrations of these low concentration metals (Fe and Zn) to facilitate photosynthesis and grow.
