= Entatic state =

In bioinorganic chemistry, an entatic state is "a state of an atom or group which, due to its binding in a protein, has its geometric or electronic condition adapted for function." The term was coined by Bert Vallee and R. J. P. Williams, following work on the catalytic activity of carbonic anhydrase. These states are thought to enhance the chemistry of metal ions in biological catalysis.

An example of an entatic state is the copper center in plastocyanin, a redox enzyme. In this protein, the copper shuttles between oxidized and reduced states, Cu^{2+} and Cu^{+}, respectively. Each oxidation state prefers a distinct coordination geometry: whereas copper(II) is normally square planar and prefers hard bases such as oxygen and nitrogen ligands, copper(I) is normally tetrahedral and binds preferentially to soft bases such as sulphur ligands. Because the electron transfer rate depends on the reorganization energy, the ideal rate would be obtained for Cu centers having a geometry intermediate between the requirements of each oxidation state. In fact, the Cu site is neither planar nor tetrahedral it is considered a distorted tetrahedral, with two nitrogen ligands from histidine residues and two sulphur ligands from methionine and cysteine residues, and can therefore be considered an entatic state. Under the entatic state hypothesis, the distortion results from strain caused by binding to ligands with relative orientation that is pre-arranged by the protein.

Some theoretical calculations show that a model system can have a geometry similar to that observed in the protein without any strain; these results, however, remain controversial.
