= Heme C =

Names
- IUPAC name Iron(II) 3-[18-(2-carboxyethyl)-3,7,12,17-tetramethyl-8,13-bis(1-sulfanylethenyl)porphyrin-21,23-diid-2-yl]propanoic acid

Identifiers
CAS Number	26598-29-8
3D model (JSmol)	Interactive image
ChemSpider	10160119
MeSH	heme+C
PubChem CID	11987638
- InChI: InChI=1S/C34H34N4O4S2.Fe/c1-15-21(7-9-31(39)40)27-14-28-22(8-10-32(41)42)16(2)24(36-28)12-29-34(20(6)44)18(4)26(38-29)13-30-33(19(5)43)17(3)25(37-30)11-23(15)35-27;/h11-14H,5-10H2,1-4H3,(H6,35,36,37,38,39,40,41,42,43,44);/q;+2/p-2/b23-11-,24-12-,25-11-,26-13-,27-14-,28-14-,29-12-,30-13-; Key: KWLVFEFHZOXGTI-IDTMDVKXSA-L
- SMILES: OC(=O)CC/c6c(\C)c3n7c6cc2c(/CCC(O)=O)c(/C)c1cc5n8c(cc4n([Fe]78n12)c(c=3)c(C(S)=C)c4c)c(\C(S)=C)c5\C

Properties
Chemical formula	C_{34}H_{36}O_{4}N_{4}S_{2}Fe
Molar mass	684.64904 g/mol
- Except where otherwise noted, data are given for materials in their standard state (at 25 °C [77 °F], 100 kPa). verify (what is ?) Infobox references

Heme C (or haem C) is an important kind of heme.

== History ==
The correct structure of heme C was published in mid 20th century by the Swedish biochemist K.-G. Paul. This work confirmed the structure first inferred by the great Swedish biochemist Hugo Theorell. The structure of heme C, based upon NMR and IR experiments of the reduced Fe(II) form of the heme, was confirmed in 1975. The structure of heme C including the absolute stereochemical configuration about the thioether bonds was first presented for the vertebrate protein, cytochrome c and is now extended to many other heme C containing proteins.

== Properties ==
Heme C differs from heme B in that the two vinyl side chains of heme B are replaced by covalent, thioether linkages to the apoprotein. The two thioether linkages are typically made by cysteine residues of the protein. These linkages do not allow the heme C to easily dissociate from the holoprotein, cytochrome c, compared with the more easily dissociated heme B that may dissociate from the holoprotein, the heme-protein complex, even under mild conditions. This allows a very wide range of cytochrome c structure and function, with myriad c type cytochromes acting primarily as electron carriers. The redox potential for cytochrome c can also be "fine-tuned" by small changes in protein structure and solvent interaction.

The number of heme C units bound to a holoprotein is highly variable. For vertebrate cells one heme C per protein is the rule but for bacteria this number is often 2, 4, 5, 6 or even 16 heme C groups per holoprotein. It is generally agreed the number and arrangement of heme C groups are related and even required for proper holoprotein function. For instance, those proteins containing several heme C groups are involved with multiple electron transfer reactions, particularly important is the 6 electron reduction required to reduce atmospheric nitrogen into two organic ammonia molecules. It is common for the heme C to amino acid ratio to be high for bacterial hemeproteins, so the interiors of some cytochrome c proteins appear packed with many heme C groups compared with other hemeproteins. Some hemeproteins, often from single cell organisms, may contain five hemes C. The bc_{1} complex is another important enzyme that contains a C type heme.

The thioether linkages seem to allow a great freedom of function for the holoproteins. In general, the c type cytochromes can be "fine tuned" over a wider range of oxidation-reduction potential than cytochromes b. This may be an important reason why cytochrome c is nearly ubiquitous throughout life. Heme C also plays an important role in apoptosis where just a few molecules of cytoplasmic cytochrome c, which must still contain heme C, leads to programmed cell death. Cytochrome c can be measured in human serum and can be used as a marker for inflammation.

In addition to these equatorial covalent bonds, the heme iron is also usually axially coordinated to the side chains of two amino acids, making the iron hexacoordinate. For example, mammalian and tuna cytochrome c contain a single heme C that is axially coordinated to side chains of both histidine and methionine. Perhaps because of the two covalent bonds holding the heme to the protein, the iron of heme C is sometimes axially ligated to the amino group of lysine or even water.

== See also ==
- Heme
- Protoporphyrin IX
- Heme A
- Heme B
- Hemeprotein
