= Cytochrome f =

Apocytochr_F_C
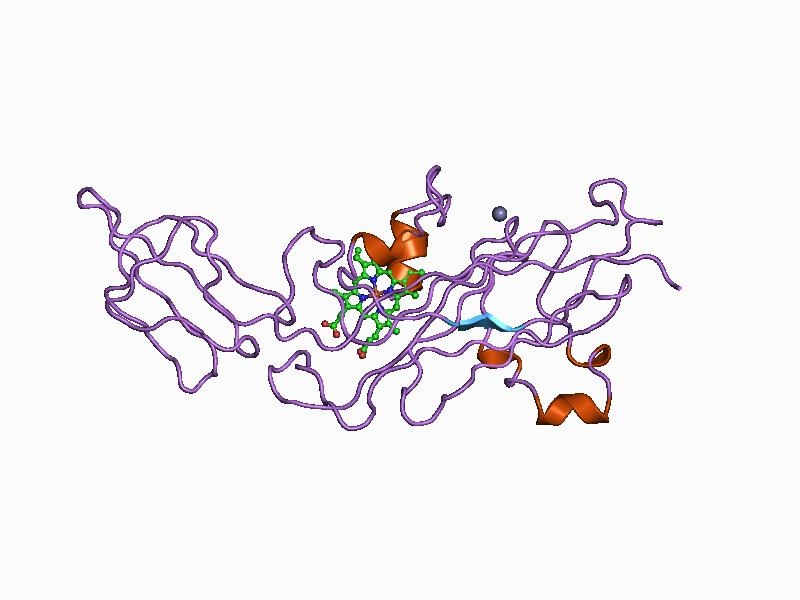
- cytochrome f from the b6f complex of Phormidium laminosum

Identifiers
- Symbol: Apocytochr_F_C
- Pfam: PF01333
- Pfam clan: CL0105
- InterPro: IPR002325
- PROSITE: PDOC00169
- SCOP2: 1ctm / SCOPe / SUPFAM
- TCDB: 3.D.3
- OPM superfamily: 92
- OPM protein: 3h1j
Available protein structures:
- Pfam: structures / ECOD
- PDB: RCSB PDB; PDBe; PDBj
- PDBsum: structure summary

Cytochrome f is the largest subunit of cytochrome b_{6}f complex (plastoquinol—plastocyanin reductase; EC 1.10.99.1). In its structure and functions, the cytochrome b6f complex bears extensive analogy to the cytochrome bc1 complex of mitochondria and photosynthetic purple bacteria. Cytochrome f (cyt f) plays a role analogous to that of cytochrome c1, in spite of their different structures.

The 3D structure of Brassica rapa (Turnip) cyt f has been determined. The lumen-side segment of cyt f includes two structural domains: a small one above a larger one that, in turn, is on top of the attachment to the membrane domain. The large domain consists of an anti-parallel beta-sandwich and a short haem-binding peptide, which form a three-layer structure. The small domain is inserted between beta-strands F and G of the large domain and is an all-beta domain. The haem nestles between two short helices at the N terminus of cyt f. Within the second helix is the sequence motif for the c-type cytochromes, CxxCH (residues 21–25), which is covalently attached to the haem through thioether bonds to Cys-21 and Cys-24. His-25 is the fifth haem iron ligand. The sixth haem iron ligand is the alpha-amino group of Tyr-1 in the first helix. Cyt f has an internal network of water molecules that may function as a proton wire. The water chain appears to be a conserved feature of cyt f.
