= Heme B =

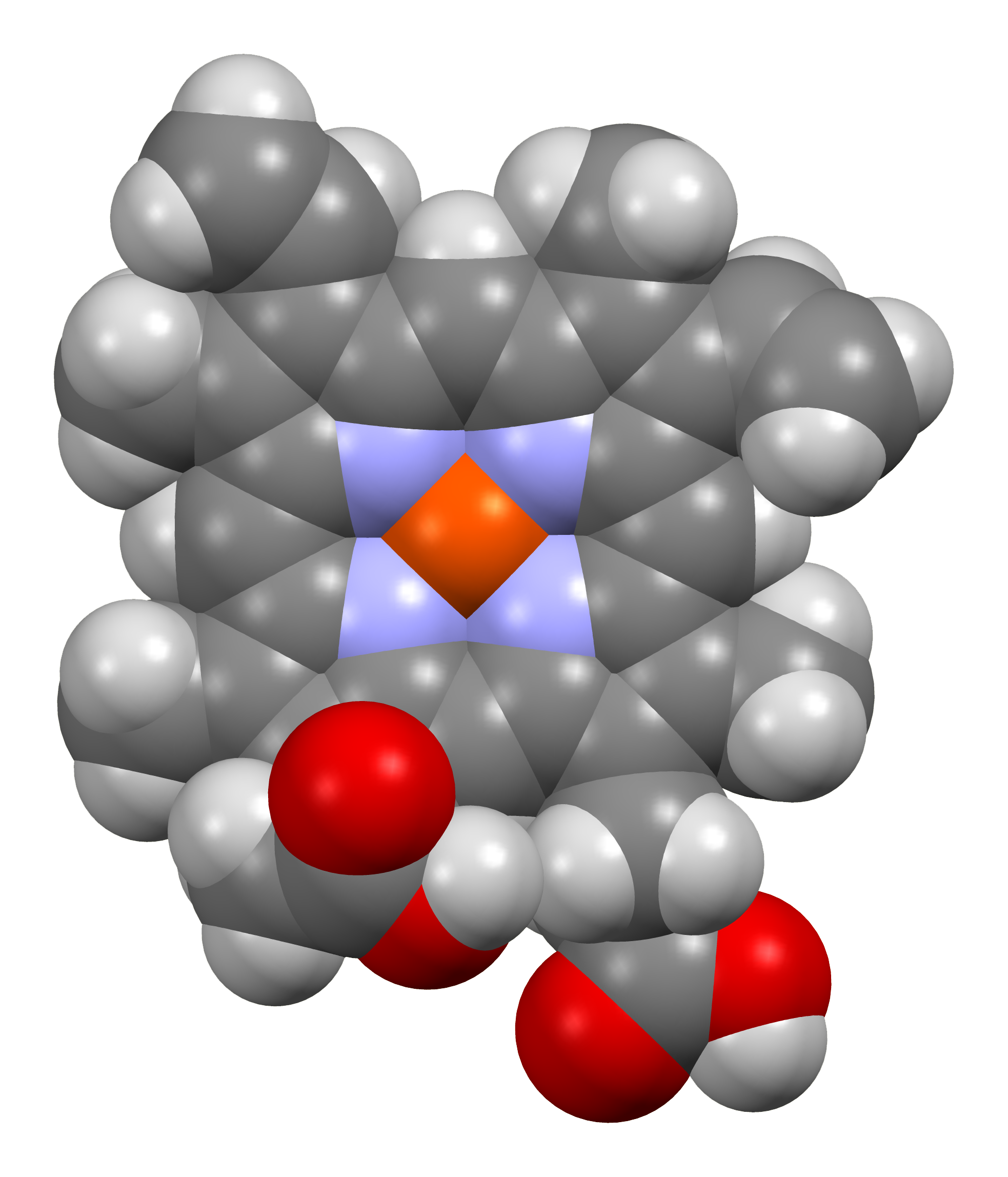

Names
- IUPAC name Iron(II) 3-[18-(2-carboxyethyl)-8,13-bis(ethenyl)-3,7,12,17-tetramethylporphyrin-21,23-diid-2-yl]propanoic acid
- Other names Iron protoporphyrin IX, protoheme IX

Identifiers
CAS Number	14875-96-8
3D model (JSmol)	Interactive image; Interactive image
ChemSpider	16739950
ECHA InfoCard	100.114.904
MeSH	Heme+b
PubChem CID	444098
UNII	42VZT0U6YR
CompTox Dashboard (EPA)	DTXSID90889386
- InChI: InChI=1S/C34H34N4O4.Fe/c1-7-21-17(3)25-13-26-19(5)23(9-11-33(39)40)31(37-26)16-32-24(10-12-34(41)42)20(6)28(38-32)15-30-22(8-2)18(4)27(36-30)14-29(21)35-25;/h7-8,13-16H,1-2,9-12H2,3-6H3,(H4,35,36,37,38,39,40,41,42);/q;+2/p-2/b25-13-,26-13-,27-14-,28-15-,29-14-,30-15-,31-16-,32-16-; Key: KABFMIBPWCXCRK-RGGAHWMASA-L; InChI=1/C34H34N4O4.Fe/c1-7-21-17(3)25-13-26-19(5)23(9-11-33(39)40)31(37-26)16-32-24(10-12-34(41)42)20(6)28(38-32)15-30-22(8-2)18(4)27(36-30)14-29(21)35-25;/h7-8,13-16H,1-2,9-12H2,3-6H3,(H4,35,36,37,38,39,40,41,42);/q;+2/p-2/b25-13-,26-13-,27-14-,28-15-,29-14-,30-15-,31-16-,32-16-;/rC34H32FeN4O4/c1-7-21-17(3)25-13-29-20(6)24(10-12-34(42)43)32-16-28-23(9-11-33(40)41)18(4)26(37-28)14-31-22(8-2)19(5)30(15-27(21)36-25)38(31)35-39(29)32/h7-8,13-16H,1-2,9-12H2,3-6H3,(H,40,41)(H,42,43)/b25-13-,26-14-,27-15-,28-16-,29-13-,30-15-,31-14-,32-16- Key: KABFMIBPWCXCRK-SMDPYJEOBB
- SMILES: OC(=O)CC/C6=C(\C)/C=3/N=C6/C=C2/C(/CCC(O)=O)=C(/C)\C1=C\C5=N\C(=C/c4n([Fe]N12)c(C=3)c(C=C)c4C)C(\C=C)=C5\C; OC(=O)CC/c6c(\C)c3n7c6cc2c(/CCC(O)=O)c(/C)c1cc5n8c(cc4n([Fe]78n12)c(c=3)c(C=C)c4c)c(\C=C)c5\C

Properties
Chemical formula	C_{34}H_{32}O_{4}N_{4}Fe
Molar mass	616.487
Appearance	Burgundy like solid #64293D (100,41,61)
Solubility	Slightly soluble in ammonia water and pyridine

Related compounds
Related compounds	Hemin, Hematin
- Except where otherwise noted, data are given for materials in their standard state (at 25 °C [77 °F], 100 kPa). Infobox references

Heme B or haem B (also known as protoheme IX) is the most abundant heme. Hemoglobin and myoglobin are examples of oxygen transport proteins that contain heme B. The peroxidase family of enzymes also contain heme B. The COX-1 and COX-2 enzymes (cyclooxygenase) of recent fame, also contain heme B at one of two active sites. Isolated heme B is slightly soluble in ammonia water and is extremely sensitive to oxygen, instantly oxidizing to a dark green to black-brown color when exposed to air.

Generally, heme B is attached to the surrounding protein matrix (known as the apoprotein) through a single coordination bond between the heme iron and an amino-acid side-chain.

Both hemoglobin and myoglobin have a coordination bond to an evolutionarily-conserved histidine, while nitric oxide synthase and cytochrome P450 have a coordination bond to an evolutionarily-conserved cysteine bound to the iron center of heme B.

Since the iron in heme B containing proteins is bound to the four nitrogens of the porphyrin (forming a plane) and a single electron donating atom of the protein, the iron is often in a pentacoordinate state. When oxygen or the toxic carbon monoxide is bound the iron becomes hexacoordinated. The correct structures of heme B and heme S were first elucidated by German chemist Hans Fischer.

== Chemical properties ==
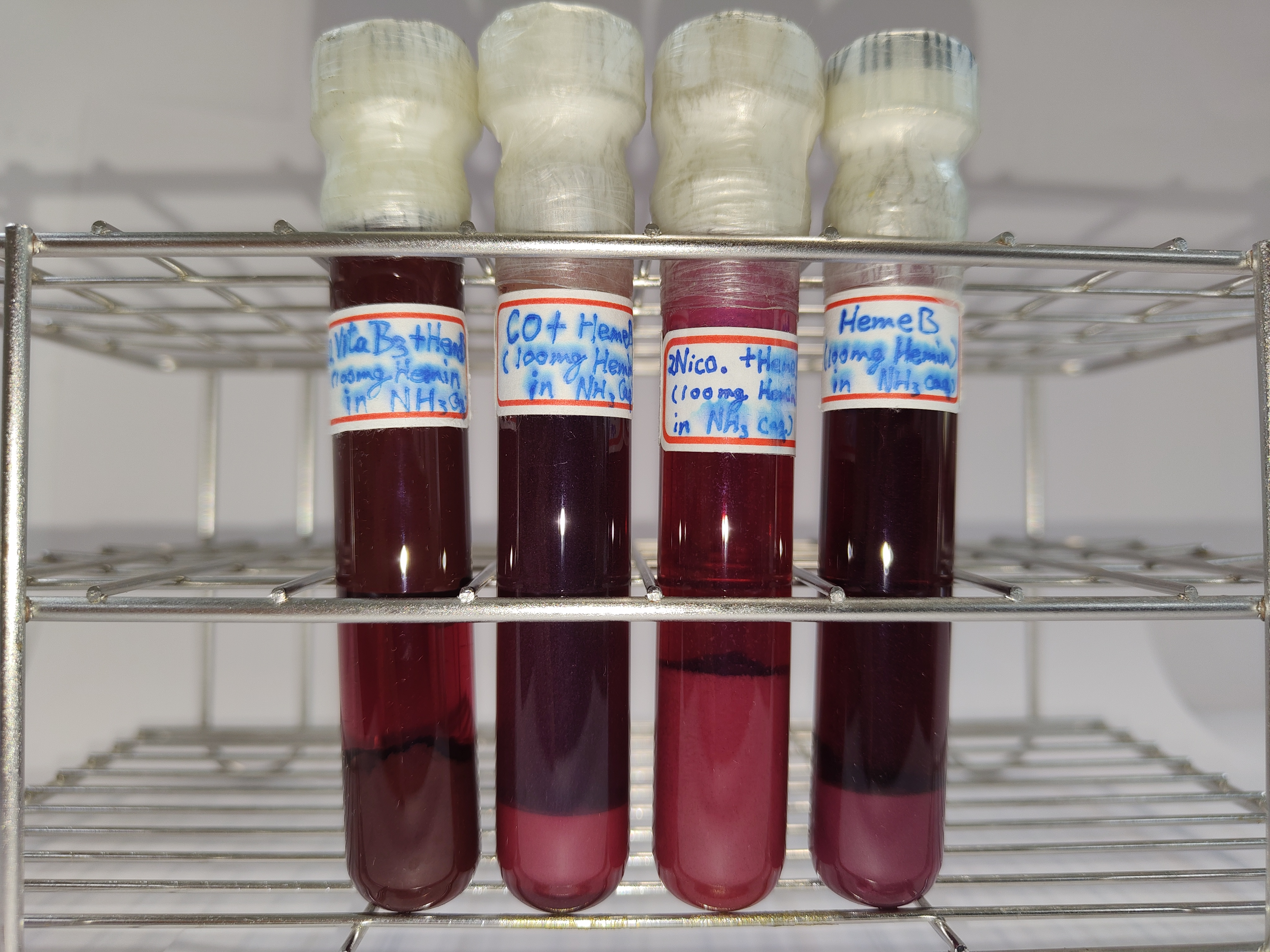
(Precipitated)

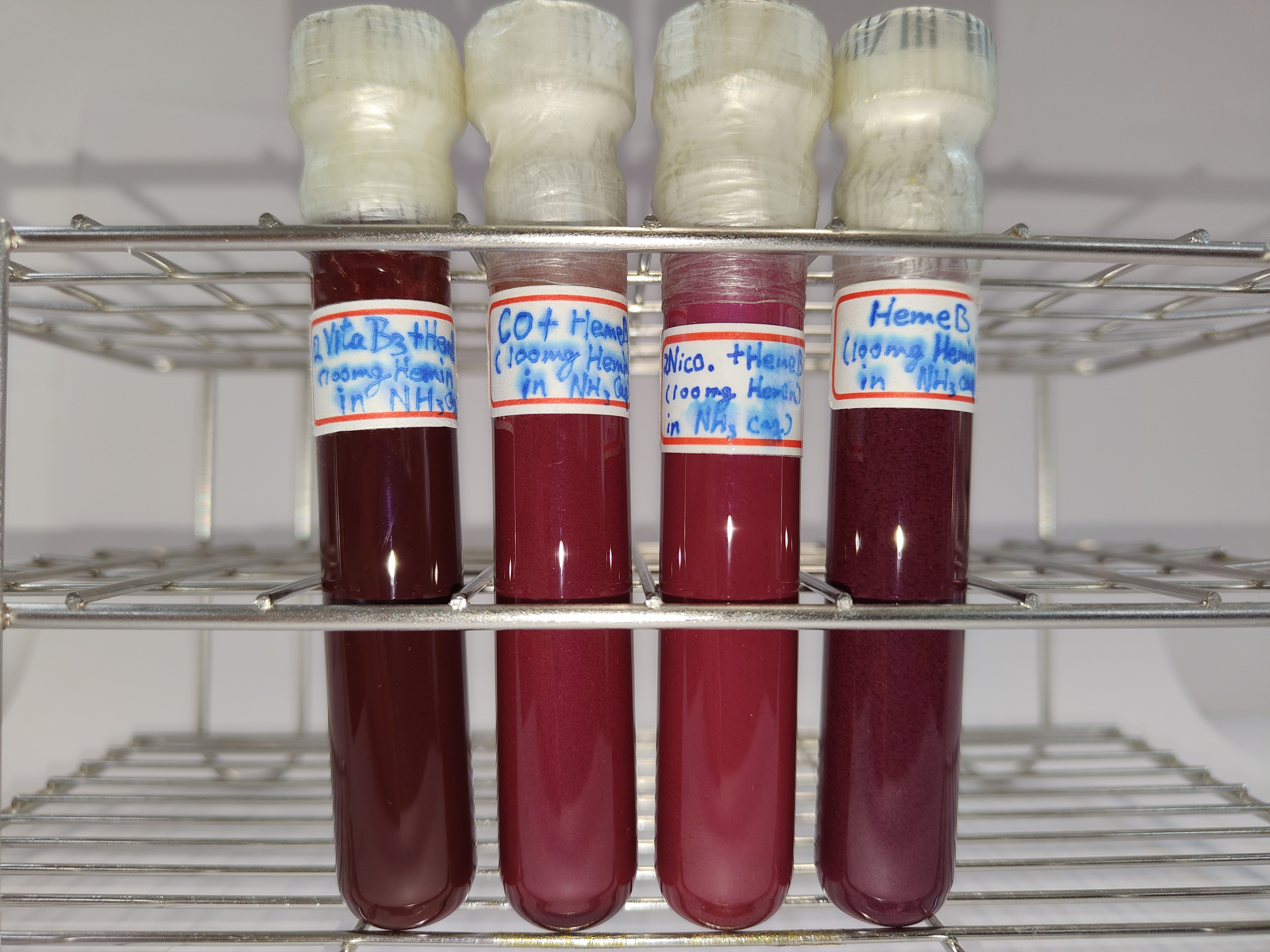
(Suspended)
These are four concentrated ammonia water solutions. From left to right: nicotinamide adduct of Heme B, carbon monoxide adduct of Heme B, nicotinic acid adduct of Heme B, and Heme B. They are slightly soluble in water and are all highly sensitive to oxygen in the air, requiring oxygen-free storage.

Heme B can be prepared by reducing Hemin in pyridine with sodium dithionite. Upon addition of the dithionite, the solution changed color and gelled:

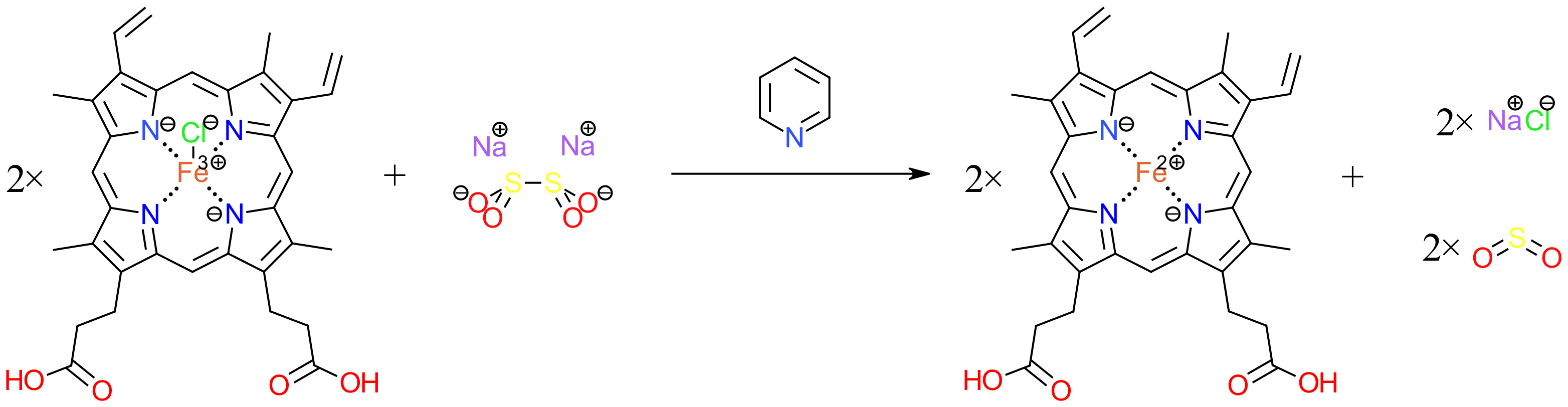
Reduction of Hemin with sodium dithionite

It can also be prepared by reducing Hemin with Raney nickel in ammonia water:

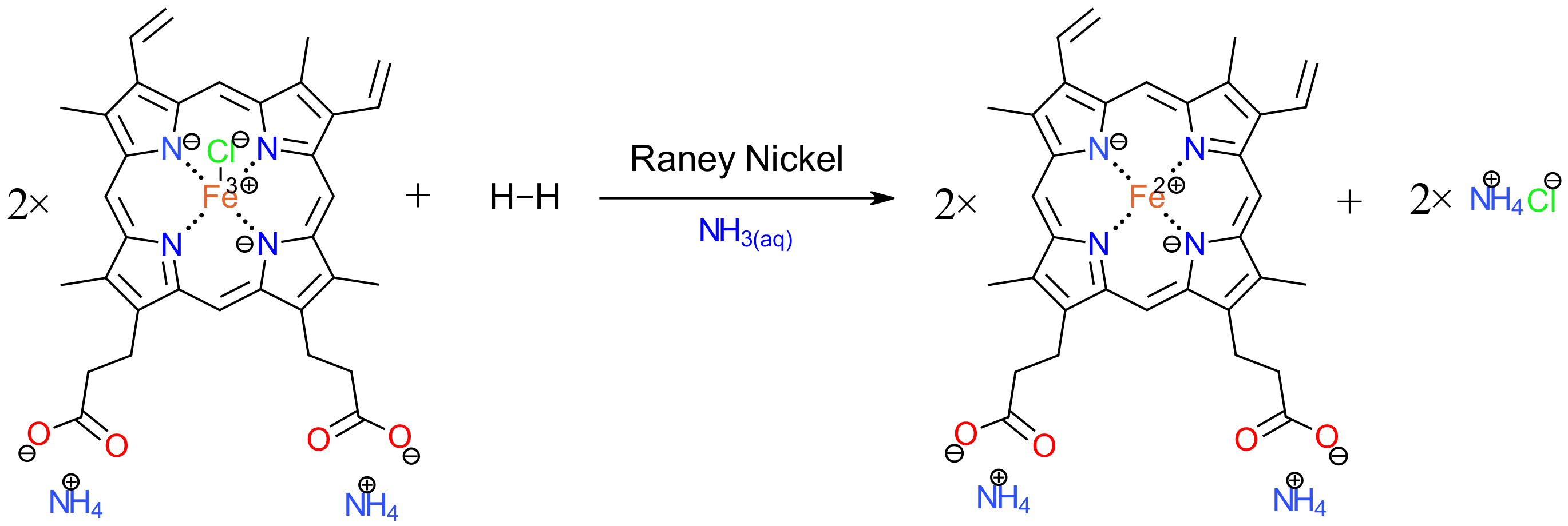
Reduction of Hemin with raney nickel

== Degradation ==
In humans, heme B is degraded by the enzyme heme oxygenase to give biliverdin, which is then converted to bilirubin by biliverdin reductase.

heme B
biliverdin
bilirubin

Bilirubin is either rendered water soluble by forming bilirubin diglucuronide and excreted from the liver in bile, or further reduced to urobilinogen.
