= Q cycle =

Series of reactions in cellular respiration

Schematic representation of complex III of the electron transport chain. The area labelled 'IM' is the inner mitochondrial membrane and the area labelled 'M' is the matrix. Q represents the ubiquinone form of CoQ, and QH_{2} represents the ubiquinol (dihydroxyquinone) form.

The Q cycle (named for quinol) describes a series of sequential oxidation and reduction of the lipophilic electron carrier Coenzyme Q (CoQ) between the ubiquinol and ubiquinone forms. These reactions can result in the net movement of protons across a lipid bilayer (in the case of the mitochondria, the inner mitochondrial membrane).

The Q cycle was first proposed by Peter D. Mitchell, though a modified version of Mitchell's original scheme is now accepted as the mechanism by which Complex III moves protons (i.e. how complex III contributes to the biochemical generation of the proton or pH, gradient, which is used for the biochemical generation of ATP).

The first reaction of Q cycle is the 2-electron oxidation of ubiquinol by two oxidants, c_{1} (Fe^{3+}) and ubiquinone:

CoQH_{2} + cytochrome c_{1} (Fe^{3+}) + CoQ' → CoQ + CoQ'^{−•} + cytochrome c_{1} (Fe^{2+}) + 2 H^{+} (intermembrane)

The second reaction of the cycle involves the 2-electron oxidation of a second ubiquinol by two oxidants, a fresh c_{1} (Fe^{3+}) and the CoQ'^{−•} produced in the first step:

CoQH_{2} + cytochrome c_{1} (Fe^{3+}) + CoQ'^{−•} + 2 H^{+} (matrix)→ CoQ + CoQ'H_{−2} + cytochrome c_{1} (Fe^{2+}) + 2 H^{+} (intermembrane)

These net reactions are mediated by electron-transfer mediators including a Rieske 2Fe-2S cluster (shunt to c_{1}) and c_{b} (shunt to CoQ' and later to CoQ'^{−•})

In chloroplasts, a similar reaction is done with plastoquinone by cytochrome b6f complex.

== Process ==
Operation of the modified Q cycle in Complex III results in the reduction of Cytochrome c, oxidation of ubiquinol to ubiquinone, and the transfer of four protons into the intermembrane space, per two-cycle process.

Ubiquinol (QH_{2}) binds to the Q_{o} site of complex III via hydrogen bonding to His182 of the Rieske iron-sulfur protein and Glu272 of Cytochrome b. Ubiquinone (Q), in turn, binds the Q_{i} site of complex III. Ubiquinol is divergently oxidized (gives up one electron each) to the Rieske iron-sulfur '(FeS) protein' and to the b_{L} heme. This oxidation reaction produces a transient semiquinone before complete oxidation to ubiquinone, which then leaves the Q_{o} site of complex III.

Having acquired one electron from ubiquinol, the 'FeS protein' is freed from its electron donor and is able to migrate to the Cytochrome c_{1} subunit. 'FeS protein' then donates its electron to Cytochrome c_{1}, reducing its bound heme group. The electron is from there transferred to an oxidized molecule of Cytochrome c externally bound to complex III, which then dissociates from the complex. In addition, the reoxidation of the 'FeS protein' releases the proton bound to His181 into the intermembrane space.

The other electron, which was transferred to the b_{L} heme, is used to reduce the b_{H} heme, which in turn transfers the electron to the ubiquinone bound at the Q_{i} site. The movement of this electron is energetically unfavourable, as the electron is moving towards the negatively charged side of the membrane. This is offset by a favourable change in E_{M} from −100 mV in B_{L} to +50mV in the B_{H} heme. The attached ubiquinone is thus reduced to a semiquinone radical. The proton taken up by Glu272 is subsequently transferred to a hydrogen-bonded water chain as Glu272 rotates 170° to hydrogen bond a water molecule, in turn hydrogen-bonded to a propionate of the b_{L} heme.

Because the last step leaves an unstable semiquinone at the Q_{i} site, the reaction is not yet fully completed. A second Q cycle is necessary, with the second electron transfer from cytochrome b_{H} reducing the semiquinone to ubiquinol. The ultimate products of the Q cycle are four protons entering the intermembrane space, two from the matrix and two from the reduction of two molecules of cytochrome c. The reduced cytochrome c is eventually reoxidized by complex IV. The process is cyclic as the ubiquinol created at the Q_{i} site can be reused by binding to the Q_{o} site of complex III.
