= TTC19 =

Protein-coding gene in the species Homo sapiens

Identifiers
- Aliases: TTC19, 2010204O13Rik, MC3DN2, tetratricopeptide repeat domain 19
- External IDs: OMIM: 613814; MGI: 1920045; GeneCards: TTC19

Gene location (Human)
Chr.	Chromosome 17 (human)
Band	17p12	Start	15,999,784 bp
Band	17p12	End	16,045,015 bp

Gene location (Mouse)
Chr.	Chromosome 11 (mouse)
Band	11|11 B2	Start	62,172,299 bp
Band	11|11 B2	End	62,219,277 bp
RNA expression pattern
Bgee	Human / Mouse (ortholog); Top expressed in: jejunal mucosa; mucosa of ileum; skin of thigh; cerebellar hemisphere; beta cell; buccal mucosa cell; ventricular zone; mucosa of colon; right hemisphere of cerebellum; duodenum / Top expressed in: superior frontal gyrus; dentate gyrus of hippocampal formation granule cell; medial dorsal nucleus; visual cortex; primary visual cortex; muscle of thigh; Paneth cell; temporal muscle; genital tubercle; neural layer of retina; More reference expression data
BioGPS	n/a
Gene ontology
Molecular function	protein binding
Cellular component	mitochondrial inner membrane; centrosome; membrane; mitochondrion; midbody; respirasome
Biological process	cell division; cell cycle; mitochondrial respiratory chain complex III assembly; cytokinesis; mitotic cytokinesis
Sources:Amigo / QuickGO
Orthologs
Databases	NCBI: entry; OMA: entry
Species	Human	Mouse
Entrez	54902	72795
Ensembl	ENSG00000011295	ENSMUSG00000042298
UniProt	Q6DKK2	Q8CC21
RefSeq (mRNA)	NM_001271420; NM_017775	NM_028360; NM_029704
RefSeq (protein)	NP_001258349; NP_060245; NP_060245.3	NP_082636; NP_083980
Location (UCSC)	Chr 17: 16 – 16.05 Mb	Chr 11: 62.17 – 62.22 Mb
PubMed search
- Wikidata
View/Edit Human	View/Edit Mouse

Tetratricopeptide repeat domain 19, also known as TPR repeat protein 19 or Tetratricopeptide repeat protein 19, mitochondrial is a protein that in humans is encoded by the TTC19 gene. This gene encodes a protein with a tetratricopeptide repeat (TPR) domain containing several TPRs of about 34 amino acids each. These repeats are found in a variety of organisms including bacteria, fungi and plants, and are involved in a variety of functions including protein-protein interactions. This protein is embedded in the inner mitochondrial membrane and is involved in the formation of the mitochondrial respiratory chain III. It has also been suggested that this protein plays a role in cytokinesis. Mutations in this gene cause mitochondrial complex III deficiency. Alternatively spliced transcript variants have been found for this gene.

== Structure ==
The TTC19 gene is located on the p arm of chromosome 17 at position 12 and it spans 46,048 base pairs. The TTC19 gene produces a 16 kDa protein composed of 149 amino acids. TTC19 is a subunit of the enzyme Ubiquinol Cytochrome c Reductase (UQCR, Complex III or Cytochrome bc1 complex) of the mitochondrial respiratory chain, which consists of the products of one mitochondrially encoded gene, MTCYTB (mitochondrial cytochrome b) and ten nuclear genes: UQCRC1, UQCRC2, Cytochrome c1, UQCRFS1 (Rieske protein), UQCRB, "14kDa protein", UQCRH (cyt c1 Hinge protein), Rieske Protein presequence, "cyt. c1 associated protein", and "Rieske-associated protein". The structure of the complex is a symmetric homodimer composed of one mitochondrial genome encoded cytochrome b subunit and ten other nucleus encoded subunits.

== Function ==
The TTC19 gene encodes for one of the ten nuclear proteins essential for the assembly and function of the Ubiquinol Cytochrome c Reductase or Complex III of the mitochondrial respiratory chain. The Ubiquinol Cytochrome c Reductase is responsible for catalyzing the transfer of electrons from coenzyme Q to cytochrome c as well as pumping protons from the matrix into the inner membrane which results in the generation of an ATP-coupled electrochemical potential. The TTC19 subunit is necessary for the preservation of the structural and functional integrity of Ubiquinol Cytochrome c Reductase, which is achieved by allowance of the physiological turnover of the Rieske protein (UQCRFS1). It also participates in the clearance of UQCRFS1 N-terminal fragments which are produced by the addition of UQCRFS1 into the Ubiquinol Cytochrome c Reductase and whose presence may lead to the failure of the complex's catalytic activity.

== Clinical significance ==
Variants of TTC19 have been associated with mitochondrial complex III deficiency, nuclear 2 (MC3DN2). TTC19 is known to cause this deficiency through the failed assembly of the Ubiquinol Cytochrome c Reductase. Mitochondrial complex III deficiency, nuclear (type 2) is a diverse group of neuromuscular and multi-systemic disorders caused by a dysfunction of the mitochondrial respiratory chain which may result in highly variable phenotype depending on which tissues are affected. Clinical features include mitochondrial encephalopathy, psychomotor retardation, ataxia, severe failure to thrive, liver dysfunction, renal tubulopathy, muscle weakness and exercise intolerance. In addition, mutations in TTC19 is also known to be associated with various neurological disorders in both childhood and adulthood. All Pathogenic mutations of this gene have been reported to be nonsense mutations. Such mutations have included (c.937C>T; p. Q313X), (c.157_158dup), and (c.829C > T; p.Q277*).

== Interactions ==
TTC19 binds to the mature mitochondrial complex III dimer after the incorporation of the Rieske protein UQCRFS1. Additional interactions include interactions with proteins UQCRC1, UQCRFS1 (by similarity), ZFYVE26, and CHMP4B.
