= UQCR10 =

Protein-coding gene in the species Homo sapiens

Identifiers
- Aliases: UQCR10, HSPC051, HSPC151, QCR9, UCCR7.2, UCRC, HSPC119, ubiquinol-cytochrome c reductase, complex III subunit X
- External IDs: OMIM: 610843; MGI: 1913402; GeneCards: UQCR10

Gene location (Human)
Chr.	Chromosome 22 (human)
Band	22q12.2	Start	29,767,369 bp
Band	22q12.2	End	29,770,413 bp

Gene location (Mouse)
Chr.	Chromosome 11 (mouse)
Band	11|11 A1	Start	4,651,973 bp
Band	11|11 A1	End	4,654,342 bp
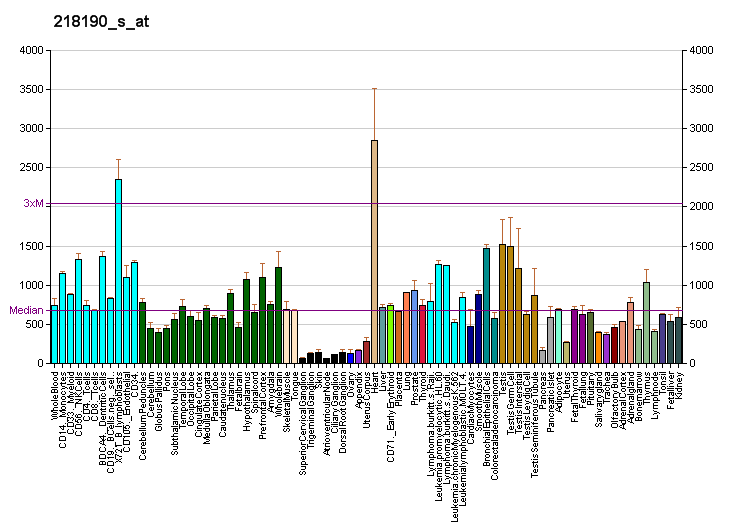
RNA expression pattern
Bgee	Human / Mouse (ortholog); Top expressed in: body of tongue; lateral nuclear group of thalamus; Skeletal muscle tissue of rectus abdominis; external globus pallidus; right ventricle; thoracic diaphragm; pars reticulata; pars compacta; pons; biceps brachii / Top expressed in: right kidney; choroid plexus of fourth ventricle; muscle of thigh; blastocyst; interventricular septum; plantaris muscle; yolk sac; lip; extensor digitorum longus muscle; superior frontal gyrus; More reference expression data
BioGPS	More reference expression data
Gene ontology
Molecular function	ubiquinol-cytochrome-c reductase activity
Cellular component	mitochondrial inner membrane; respirasome; membrane; mitochondrion; mitochondrial respiratory chain complex III
Biological process	mitochondrial respiratory chain complex III assembly; mitochondrial electron transport, ubiquinol to cytochrome c; aerobic dissimilation
Sources:Amigo / QuickGO
Orthologs
Databases	NCBI: entry; OMA: entry
Species	Human	Mouse
Entrez	29796	66152
Ensembl	ENSG00000184076	ENSMUSG00000059534
UniProt	Q9UDW1	Q8R1I1
RefSeq (mRNA)	NM_013387; NM_001003684	NM_001047158; NM_197979; NM_001362879
RefSeq (protein)	NP_001003684; NP_037519	NP_932096; NP_001349808
Location (UCSC)	Chr 22: 29.77 – 29.77 Mb	Chr 11: 4.65 – 4.65 Mb
PubMed search
- Wikidata
View/Edit Human	View/Edit Mouse

Ubiquinol-cytochrome c reductase complex (7.2 kD), also known as UCRC or UQCR10, is a human gene.

Its gene product is a subunit of the respiratory chain protein Ubiquinol Cytochrome c Reductase (UQCR, Complex III or Cytochrome bc1 complex), which consists of the products of one mitochondrially encoded gene, MTCYTB (mitochondrial cytochrome b) and ten nuclear genes: UQCRC1, UQCRC2, Cytochrome c1, UQCRFS1 (Rieske protein), UQCRB, UQCRQ ("11kDa protein"), UQCRH (cyt c1 Hinge protein), Rieske Protein presequence, UCRC("cyt. c1 associated protein"), and UQCR ("Rieske-associated protein").
