= MT-CYB =

Mitochondrial protein-coding gene

Identifiers
- Aliases: MT-CYB, cytochrome b, CYTB
- External IDs: OMIM: 516020; MGI: 102501; GeneCards: MT-CYB
Gene location (Human)
Chr.	Mitochondrial DNA (human)
Band	n/a	Start	14,747 bp
Band	n/a	End	15,887 bp
Gene location (Mouse)
Chr.	Mitochondrial DNA (mouse)
Band	n/a	Start	14,145 bp
Band	n/a	End	15,288 bp
RNA expression pattern
Bgee	Human / Mouse (ortholog); Top expressed in: apex of heart; gastric mucosa; right lobe of thyroid gland; left ventricle; putamen; caudate nucleus; left uterine tube; nucleus accumbens; subcutaneous adipose tissue; right adrenal cortex / Top expressed in: neural layer of retina; hypothalamus; striatum of neuraxis; adrenal gland; dentate gyrus of hippocampal formation granule cell; right kidney; primary visual cortex; superior frontal gyrus; cerebellum; cerebellar cortex; More reference expression data
BioGPS	n/a
Gene ontology
Molecular function	ubiquinol-cytochrome-c reductase activity; protein-containing complex binding; metal ion binding; electron transfer activity; oxidoreductase activity; heme binding
Cellular component	mitochondrial respiratory chain complex III; integral component of membrane; respiratory chain complex III; membrane; mitochondrion; mitochondrial inner membrane; respirasome; integral component of mitochondrial inner membrane; protein-containing complex
Biological process	response to hypoxia; response to glucagon; response to cadmium ion; response to organic cyclic compound; response to nutrient; response to copper ion; response to hyperoxia; hyperosmotic salinity response; response to heat; response to calcium ion; animal organ regeneration; response to organonitrogen compound; response to hormone; response to mercury ion; response to ethanol; response to toxic substance; response to cobalamin; proton transmembrane transport; respiratory electron transport chain; mitochondrial electron transport, ubiquinol to cytochrome c; electron transport coupled proton transport
Sources:Amigo / QuickGO
Orthologs
Databases	NCBI: entry; OMA: entry
Species	Human	Mouse
Entrez	4519	17711
Ensembl	ENSG00000198727	ENSMUSG00000064370
UniProt	P00156	P00158
RefSeq (mRNA)	n/a	n/a
RefSeq (protein)	n/a	NP_904340
Location (UCSC)	Chr M: 0.01 – 0.02 Mb	Chr M: 0.01 – 0.02 Mb
PubMed search
- Wikidata
View/Edit Human	View/Edit Mouse

Location of the MT-CYB gene in the human mitochondrial genome (coral box).

Cytochrome b is a protein that in humans is encoded by the MT-CYB gene. Its gene product is a subunit of the respiratory chain protein ubiquinol–cytochrome c reductase (UQCR, complex III or cytochrome bc_{1} complex), which consists of the products of one mitochondrially encoded gene, MT-CYB (mitochondrial cytochrome b), and ten nuclear genes—UQCRC1, UQCRC2, CYC1, UQCRFS1 (Rieske protein), UQCRB, "11kDa protein", UQCRH (cyt c_{1} Hinge protein), Rieske protein presequence, "cyt c_{1} associated protein", and Rieske-associated protein.

== Structure ==
The MT-CYB gene is located on the p arm of mitochondrial DNA in position 12 and spans 1,140 base pairs. The gene produces a 42.7 kDa protein named cytochrome b composed of 380 amino acids. Cytochrome b is an integral membrane protein with hydrophobic properties. The catalytic core of the enzyme is composed of eight transmembrane helices, the iron-sulfur protein, and cytochrome c1. Cytochrome b is a fundamental component of the ubiquinol-cytochrome c reductase complex (complex III or cytochrome b-c1 complex) that is part of the mitochondrial respiratory chain. The b-c1 complex mediates electron transfer from ubiquinol to cytochrome c. The structure of the complex is a symmetric homodimer. It is composed of eleven structural subunits, including one mitochondrial genome encoded cytochrome b and ten other nucleus encoded subunits. These subunits include three respiratory subunits (MT-CYB, CYC1 and UQCRFS1), two core proteins (UQCRC1 and UQCRC2) and six low-molecular weight proteins (UQCRH/QCR6, UQCRB/QCR7, UQCRQ/QCR8, UQCR10/QCR9, UQCR11/QCR10 and a cleavage product of UQCRFS1). The total molecular mass of the complex is about 450 kDa.

== Function ==
The mitochondrial cytochrome b is fundamental for the assembly and function of Complex III of the mitochondrial respiratory chain. Complex III is responsible for the catalysis of electron transfer from coenzyme Q to cytochrome c in the mitochondrial respiratory chain by translocating protons concomitantly across the inner membrane of the mitochondria. The transfer of electrons then contributes to the generation of a proton gradient across the mitochondrial membrane that is then used for ATP synthesis.

== Clinical significance ==
Mutations in MT-CYB can result in mitochondrial deficiencies and associated disorders. It is majorly associated with a complex III deficiency, a deficiency in an enzyme complex which catalyzes electron transfer from coenzyme Q to cytochrome c in the mitochondrial respiratory chain. A complex III deficiency can result in a highly variable phenotype depending on which tissues are affected. Most frequent clinical manifestations include progressive exercise intolerance and cardiomyopathy. Occasional multisystem disorders accompanied by exercise intolerance may arise as well, in forms of deafness, mental retardation, retinitis pigmentosa, cataract, growth retardation, and epilepsy. Other phenotypes include mitochondrial encephalomyopathy, mitochondrial myopathy, Leber hereditary optic neuropathy, muscle weakness, myoglobinuria, blood acidosis, renal tubulopathy, and more. Complex III deficiency is known to be rare among mitochondrial diseases and may follow a maternal or mendelian mode of inheritance due to its duality of genetic origin.
