= UQCRFS1 =

Protein-coding gene in the species Homo sapiens

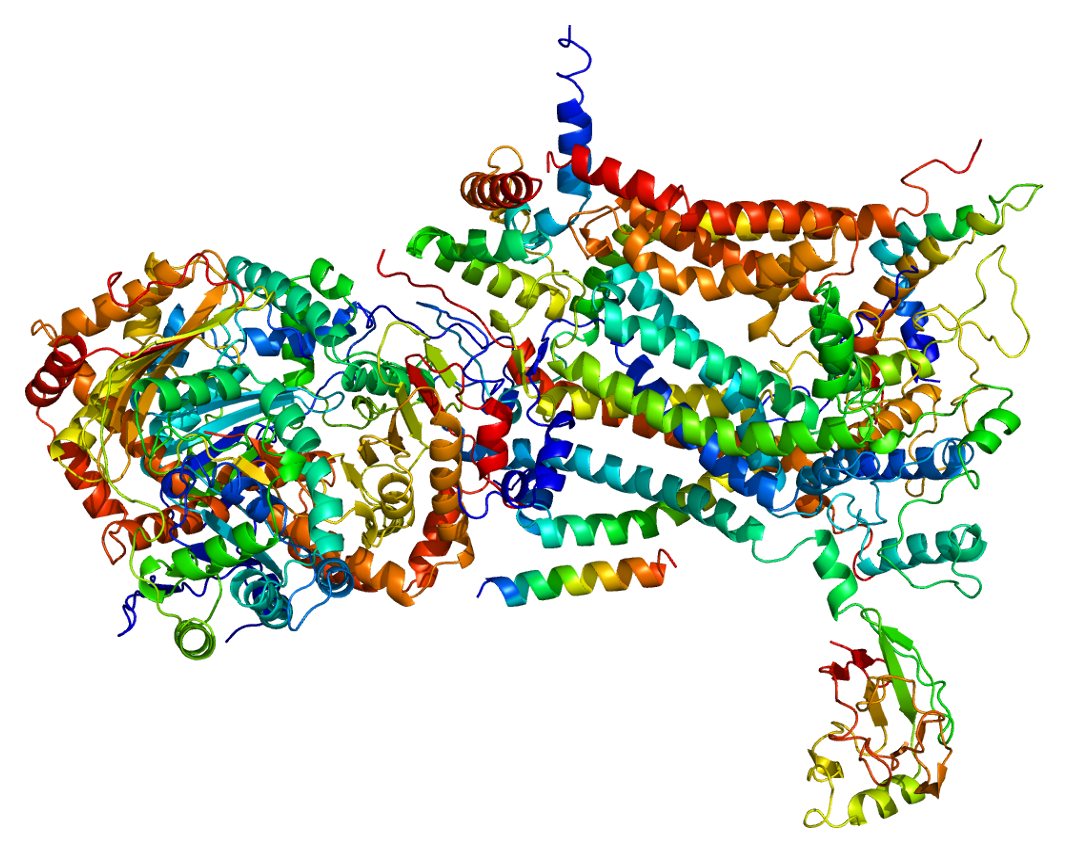

Identifiers
- Aliases: UQCRFS1, RIP1, RIS1, RISP, UQCR5, ubiquinol-cytochrome c reductase, Rieske iron-sulfur polypeptide 1, MC3DN10
- External IDs: OMIM: 191327; MGI: 1913944; GeneCards: UQCRFS1
Enzyme activity
EC #	BRENDA	ExPASy	KEGG	MetaCyc
7.1.1.8	↗	↗	↗	↗

Gene location (Human)
Chr.	Chromosome 19 (human)
Band	19q12	Start	29,205,320 bp
Band	19q12	End	29,213,151 bp

Gene location (Mouse)
Chr.	Chromosome 13 (mouse)
Band	13|13 A3.2	Start	30,724,291 bp
Band	13|13 A3.2	End	30,729,345 bp
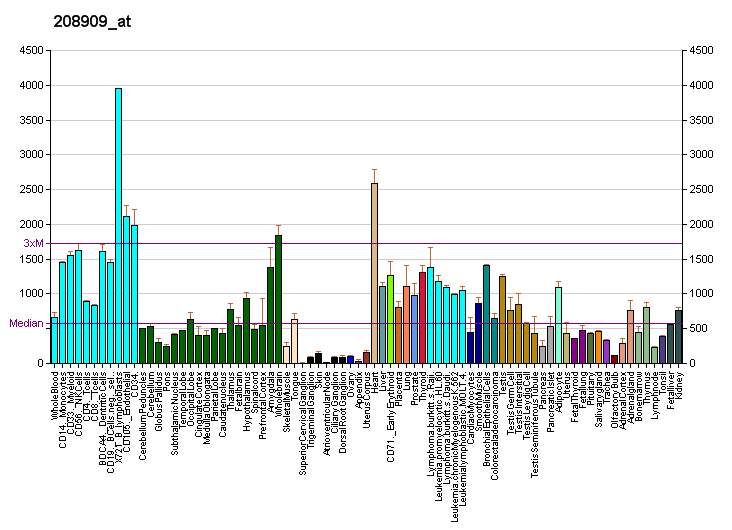
RNA expression pattern
Bgee	Human / Mouse (ortholog); Top expressed in: gastrocnemius muscle; left ventricle; mucosa of transverse colon; muscle of thigh; apex of heart; right auricle of heart; skeletal muscle tissue; right adrenal gland; right adrenal cortex; rectum / Top expressed in: myocardium of ventricle; right ventricle; soleus muscle; extraocular muscle; digastric muscle; vastus lateralis muscle; thoracic diaphragm; temporal muscle; right kidney; triceps brachii muscle; More reference expression data
BioGPS	More reference expression data
Gene ontology
Molecular function	ubiquinol-cytochrome-c reductase activity; protein-containing complex binding; iron-sulfur cluster binding; metal ion binding; oxidoreductase activity; 2 iron, 2 sulfur cluster binding; oxidoreductase activity, acting on diphenols and related substances as donors; protein binding
Cellular component	integral component of membrane; membrane; mitochondrial membranes; myelin sheath; mitochondrion; mitochondrial inner membrane; respirasome; mitochondrial respiratory chain complex III; mitochondrial respiratory chain complex IV
Biological process	proton transmembrane transport; response to antibiotic; response to hormone; mitochondrial electron transport, ubiquinol to cytochrome c
Sources:Amigo / QuickGO
Orthologs
Databases	NCBI: entry; OMA: entry
Species	Human	Mouse
Entrez	7386	66694
Ensembl	ENSG00000169021	ENSMUSG00000038462
UniProt	P47985	Q9CR68
RefSeq (mRNA)	NM_006003	NM_025710
RefSeq (protein)	NP_005994	NP_079986
Location (UCSC)	Chr 19: 29.21 – 29.21 Mb	Chr 13: 30.72 – 30.73 Mb
PubMed search
- Wikidata
View/Edit Human	View/Edit Mouse

Ubiquinol-cytochrome c reductase, Rieske iron-sulfur polypeptide 1, also known as UQCRFS1, Rieske iron-sulfur (Fe-S) protein, Cytochrome b-c1 complex subunit 5, or Complex III subunit 5 is a protein which in humans is encoded by the UQCRFS1 gene. UQCRFS1 is a subunit of the respiratory chain protein Ubiquinol Cytochrome c Reductase (UQCR, Complex III or Cytochrome bc1 complex), which consists of both the product of one mitochondrially encoded gene, MTCYTB (mitochondrial cytochrome b) and the products of ten nuclear genes UQCRC1, UQCRC2, Cytochrome C1, UQCRFS1 (this protein, a type of Rieske protein), UQCRB,UQCRQ ("11kDa protein"), UQCRH (cyt c1 Hinge protein), UCRC ("cyt. c1 associated protein"), and UQCR ("Rieske-associated protein").

== Structure ==
Cytochrome b-c1 complex subunit Rieske, transmembrane domain

Identifiers
- Symbol: UCR_TM
- Pfam: PF02921
- InterPro: IPR004192
Available protein structures:
- PDB: IPR004192 PF02921 (ECOD; PDBsum)
- AlphaFold: IPR004192; PF02921

UQCRFS1 is located on the q arm of chromosome 19 in position 12, has 2 exons, and spans 5,969 base pairs. The UQCRFS1 gene produces a 29.7 kDa protein composed of 274 amino acids. UQCRFS1 is a subunit of the respiratory chain protein Ubiquinol Cytochrome c Reductase (UQCR, Complex III or Cytochrome bc1 complex). The structure of the complex is a symmetric homodimer composed of one mitochondrial genome encoded cytochrome b subunit and ten other nucleus encoded subunits. The primary structure of UQCRFS1 from cDNA analysis is composed of a 78 amino acid long N-terminal extension sequence.

== Function ==
The UQCRFS1 gene encodes for an iron-sulfur protein, which is an essential subunit of the Ubiquinol Cytochrome c Reductase or Complex III in the mitochondrial respiratory chain. Complex III is responsible for electron transfer from coenzyme Q to cytochrome c as well as the proton transfer from the extracellular matrix to the intermembrane space which leads to ATP-coupled electrochemical potential generation. Incorporation of the subunit UQCRFS1 is the second to last step in complex III assembly. Once it is incorporated, UQCRFS1 undergoes proteolytic processing, which is essential for the correct insertion into Complex III. Preventions of the insertion may occur due to UQCRFS1-derived fragments, leading to a loss of Complex III structure and function.

== Clinical significance ==
The UQCRFS1 gene has been shown to be involved in carcinogenesis of some cancers. It is mainly associated with more aggressive tumors, and results in the development of more aggressive phenotypes of breast cancers. The association was found with a grade 3 amplification of the UQCRFS1 gene. In addition, Acute myeloid leukemia (AML) has been found to be associated with the amplification of UQCRFS1 gene. In contrast, UQCRFS1 and complex III has been absent in renal cell carcinoma, though the mechanism is unknown.

== Interactions ==
In addition to co-complexes, UQCRFS1 has protein-protein interactions with UQCRB, BCS1L, COX6B1, UQCRQ, NDUFA9, and other proteins.
