= Myxothiazol =

Names
- IUPAC name 7-{2'-[(1S,2E,4E)-1,6-Dimethyl-2,4-heptadienyl][2,4'-bithiazol]-4-yl}-3,5-dimethoxy-4-methyl- (2E,4R,5S,6E)-2,6-heptadienamide

Identifiers
CAS Number	76706-55-3
3D model (JSmol)	Interactive image
ChEBI	CHEBI:25461
ChemSpider	4941921
ECHA InfoCard	100.151.224
MeSH	Myxothiazol
PubChem CID	6437357
UNII	6VY98BQ7NB
- InChI: InChI=1S/C25H33N3O3S2/c1-16(2)9-7-8-10-17(3)24-28-20(15-33-24)25-27-19(14-32-25)11-12-21(30-5)18(4)22(31-6)13-23(26)29/h7-18,21H,1-6H3,(H2,26,29)/b9-7+,10-8+,12-11+,22-13+/t17?,18-,21+/m1/s1 Key: XKTFQMCPGMTBMD-YCSHSZEBSA-N
- SMILES: C[C@H]([C@H](/C=C/c1csc(n1)c2csc(n2)C(C)/C=C/C=C/C(C)C)OC)/C(=C\C(=O)N)/OC

Properties
Chemical formula	C_{25}H_{33}N_{3}O_{3}S_{2}
Molar mass	487.68 g·mol^{−1}
- Except where otherwise noted, data are given for materials in their standard state (at 25 °C [77 °F], 100 kPa). verify (what is ?) Infobox references

Myxothiazol is a chemical compound produced by the myxobacterium Myxococcus fulvus. It is an inhibitor of the mitochondrial cytochrome bc1 complex (coenzyme Q - cytochrome c reductase).

Myxothiazol is a competitive inhibitor of ubiquinol, and binds at the quinol oxidation (Qo) site of the bc1 complex, blocking electron transfer to the Rieske iron-sulfur protein. Binding of myxothiazol induces a red-shift to the visible absorption spectrum of reduced haem bl. In contrast to stigmatellin, myxothiazol does not form a hydrogen bond to the Rieske iron-sulfur protein, binding instead in the 'b-proximal' region of the cytochrome b Qo site. Movement of the cytoplasmic domain of the Rieske protein is therefore unaffected by the binding of this inhibitor.
