= Biphenyl 2,3-dioxygenase =

Class of enzymes

Identifiers
- EC no.: 1.14.12.18

Databases
- IntEnz: IntEnz view
- BRENDA: BRENDA entry
- ExPASy: NiceZyme view
- KEGG: KEGG entry
- MetaCyc: metabolic pathway
- PRIAM: profile
- PDB structures: RCSB PDB PDBe PDBsum
- Gene Ontology: AmiGO / QuickGO
Search
- PMC: articles
- PubMed: articles
- NCBI: proteins

Biphenyl 2,3-dioxygenase (EC 1.14.12.18) is an enzyme that catalyzes the chemical reaction

biphenyl
+ NADH
O_{2} + H^{+}
(1''S'',2''R'')-3-phenylcyclohexa-3,5-diene-1,2-diol
+ NAD^{+}

The four substrates of this enzyme are biphenyl, reduced nicotinamide adenine dinucleotide (NADH), oxygen, and a proton. Its products are (1S,2R)-3-phenylcyclohexa-3,5-diene-1,2-diol and oxidised NAD^{+}.

This enzyme is an oxidoreductase that uses molecular oxygen as oxidant and incorporates both its atoms into the starting material. The systematic name of this enzyme class is biphenyl,NADH:oxygen oxidoreductase (2,3-hydroxylating). It is also called biphenyl dioxygenase. It is a Rieske protein containing an iron–sulfur cluster and participates in biphenyl degradation.

== Structural studies ==
As of late 2007, two structures have been solved for this class of enzymes, with PDB accession codes 1ULI and 1ULJ.
