= UQCRC2 =

Protein-coding gene in the species Homo sapiens

Identifiers
- Aliases: UQCRC2, MC3DN5, QCR2, UQCR2, ubiquinol-cytochrome c reductase core protein II, ubiquinol-cytochrome c reductase core protein 2
- External IDs: OMIM: 191329; MGI: 1914253; GeneCards: UQCRC2

Gene location (Human)
Chr.	Chromosome 16 (human)
Band	16p12.2	Start	21,953,288 bp
Band	16p12.2	End	21,983,660 bp

Gene location (Mouse)
Chr.	Chromosome 7 (mouse)
Band	7|7 F2	Start	120,234,399 bp
Band	7|7 F2	End	120,258,747 bp
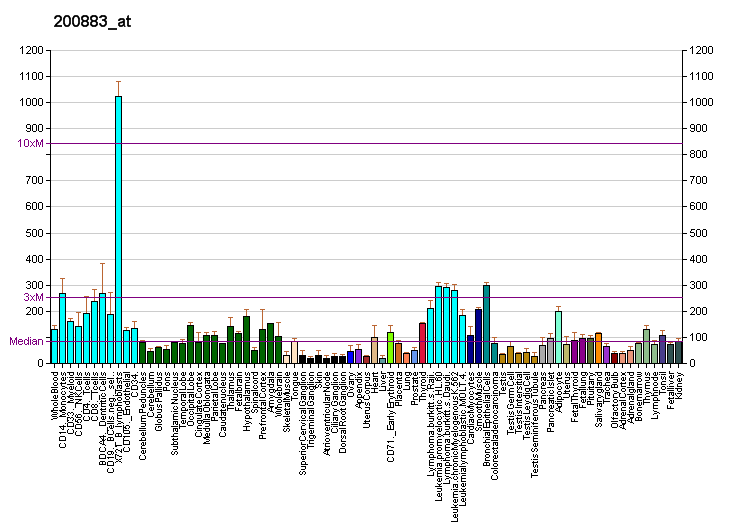

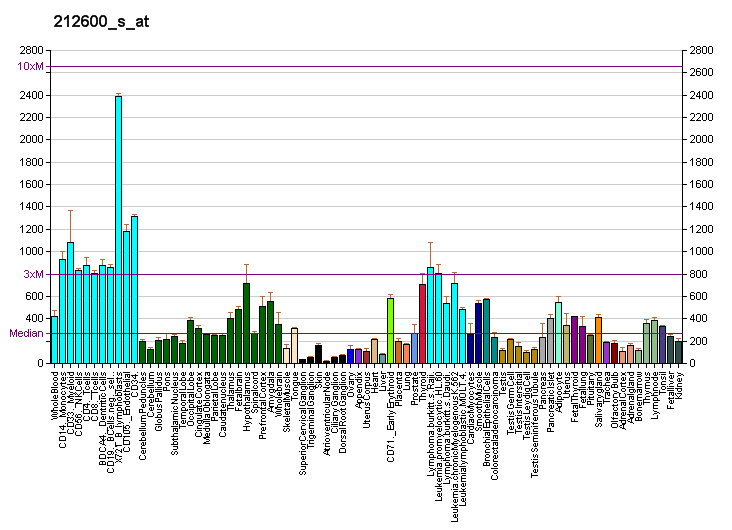
RNA expression pattern
Bgee	Human / Mouse (ortholog); Top expressed in: right ventricle; body of tongue; Skeletal muscle tissue of rectus abdominis; jejunal mucosa; apex of heart; duodenum; mucosa of sigmoid colon; rectum; muscle of thigh; biceps brachii / Top expressed in: Paneth cell; myocardium of ventricle; medullary collecting duct; facial motor nucleus; substantia nigra; cardiac muscles; atrioventricular junction; cardiac muscle tissue of left ventricle; migratory enteric neural crest cell; atrioventricular valve; More reference expression data
BioGPS	More reference expression data
Gene ontology
Molecular function	protein-containing complex binding; zinc ion binding; metal ion binding; protein binding; catalytic activity; metalloendopeptidase activity; endopeptidase activity
Cellular component	membrane; myelin sheath; nucleoplasm; mitochondrion; respirasome; extracellular exosome; mitochondrial inner membrane; mitochondrial respiratory chain complex III; mitochondrial respiratory chain complex IV; mitochondrial processing peptidase complex
Biological process	proteolysis; aerobic dissimilation; oxidative phosphorylation; mitochondrial electron transport, ubiquinol to cytochrome c; protein processing involved in protein targeting to mitochondrion
Sources:Amigo / QuickGO
Orthologs
Databases	NCBI: entry; OMA: entry
Species	Human	Mouse
Entrez	7385	67003
Ensembl	ENSG00000140740	ENSMUSG00000030884
UniProt	P22695	Q9DB77
RefSeq (mRNA)	NM_003366	NM_025899
RefSeq (protein)	NP_003357	NP_080175
Location (UCSC)	Chr 16: 21.95 – 21.98 Mb	Chr 7: 120.23 – 120.26 Mb
PubMed search
- Wikidata
View/Edit Human	View/Edit Mouse

Cytochrome b-c1 complex subunit 2, mitochondrial (UQCRC2), also known as QCR2, UQCR2, or MC3DN5 is a protein that in humans is encoded by the UQCRC2 gene. The product of UQCRC2 is a subunit of the respiratory chain protein Ubiquinol Cytochrome c Reductase (UQCR, Complex III or Cytochrome bc1 complex), which consists of the products of one mitochondrially encoded gene, MTCYTB (mitochondrial cytochrome b) and ten nuclear genes: UQCRC1, UQCRC2, Cytochrome c1, UQCRFS1 (Rieske protein), UQCRB, "11kDa protein", UQCRH (cyt c1 Hinge protein), Rieske Protein presequence, "cyt. c1 associated protein", and "Rieske-associated protein." Defects in UQCRC2 are associated with mitochondrial complex III deficiency, nuclear, type 5.

== Structure ==
UQCRC2 is located on the p arm of chromosome 16 in position 12.2 and has 14 exons. The UQCRC2 gene produces a 48.4 kDa protein composed of 453 amino acids. UQCRC2 belongs to the peptidase M16 family and UQCRC2/QCR2 subfamily. UQCRC2 has a transit peptide domain. Ubiquinol Cytochrome c Reductase (b-c1 complex) contains 11 subunits: 3 respiratory subunits (cytochrome b, cytochrome c1 and Rieske/UQCRFS1), 2 core proteins (UQCRC1/QCR1 and UQCRC2/QCR2) and 6 low-molecular weight proteins (UQCRH/QCR6, UQCRB/QCR7, UQCRQ/QCR8, UQCR10/QCR9, UQCR11/QCR10 and a cleavage product of Rieske/UQCRFS1). UQCRC2 is part of the hydrophobic core of the b-c1 complex and is necessary for the stabilization of Ubiquinol Cytochrome c Reductase.

== Function ==
The protein encoded by this gene is located in the mitochondrion, where it is part of the ubiquinol-cytochrome c reductase complex (also known as complex III). This complex constitutes a part of the mitochondrial respiratory chain. The core protein UQCRC2 is required for the assembly and stabilization of the complex.

== Clinical Significance ==
Variants of UQCRC2 have been associated with mitochondrial complex III deficiency, nuclear, type 5. Mitochondrial complex III deficiency nuclear type 5 is a disorder of the mitochondrial respiratory chain resulting in a highly variable phenotype depending on which tissues are affected. Clinical features include mitochondrial encephalopathy, psychomotor retardation, ataxia, severe failure to thrive, liver dysfunction, renal tubulopathy, muscle weakness, exercise intolerance, lactic acidosis and hypoglycemia. Homozygous mutations resulting in a change from Arginine to Tryptophan at position 183 have been associated with mitochondrial complex III deficiency due to UQCRC2 dysfunction. Autosomal recessive inheritance has been proposed as a transmission pattern.

== Interactions ==
UQCRC2 has 98 protein-protein interactions with 90 of them being co-complex interactions. CAC1A, QCR1, UQCRC1, CACNA1A, STOM, a8k1f4, HLA-B, ARF6, and Mapk3 have been found to interact with UQCRC2.
