= UQCRB =

Protein

Identifiers
- Aliases: UQCRB, MC3DN3, QCR7, QP-C, QPC, UQBC, UQBP, UQCR6, UQPC, ubiquinol-cytochrome c reductase binding protein
- External IDs: OMIM: 191330; MGI: 1914780; GeneCards: UQCRB

Gene location (Human)
Chr.	Chromosome 8 (human)
Band	8q22.1	Start	96,222,947 bp
Band	8q22.1	End	96,235,546 bp

Gene location (Mouse)
Chr.	Chromosome 13 (mouse)
Band	13|13 B3	Start	67,048,681 bp
Band	13|13 B3	End	67,053,442 bp
RNA expression pattern
Bgee	Human / Mouse (ortholog); Top expressed in: right ventricle; vena cava; Epithelium of choroid plexus; right auricle of heart; renal medulla; retinal pigment epithelium; apex of heart; biceps brachii; Skeletal muscle tissue of biceps brachii; body of tongue / Top expressed in: right kidney; quadriceps femoris muscle; muscle tissue; skeletal muscle tissue; muscle of thigh; proximal tubule; heart; stomach; human kidney; blastocyst; More reference expression data
BioGPS	n/a
Gene ontology
Molecular function	protein binding; ubiquinol-cytochrome-c reductase activity
Cellular component	mitochondrial inner membrane; respirasome; membrane; mitochondrion; mitochondrial respirasome; mitochondrial respiratory chain complex III
Biological process	aerobic dissimilation; oxidative phosphorylation; mitochondrial respiratory chain complex III assembly; mitochondrial electron transport, ubiquinol to cytochrome c
Sources:Amigo / QuickGO
Orthologs
Databases	NCBI: entry; OMA: entry
Species	Human	Mouse
Entrez	7381	67530
Ensembl	ENSG00000156467	ENSMUSG00000021520
UniProt	P14927	Q9D855; Q9CQB4
RefSeq (mRNA)	NM_001199975; NM_001254752; NM_006294	NM_026219
RefSeq (protein)	NP_001186904; NP_001241681; NP_006285	NP_080495
Location (UCSC)	Chr 8: 96.22 – 96.24 Mb	Chr 13: 67.05 – 67.05 Mb
PubMed search
- Wikidata
View/Edit Human	View/Edit Mouse

Ubiquinol-cytochrome c reductase binding protein, also known as UQCRB, Complex III subunit 7, QP-C, or Ubiquinol-cytochrome c reductase complex 14 kDa protein is a protein which in humans is encoded by the UQCRB gene. This gene encodes a subunit of the ubiquinol-cytochrome c oxidoreductase complex, which consists of one mitochondrial-encoded and 10 nuclear-encoded subunits. Mutations in this gene are associated with mitochondrial complex III deficiency. Alternatively spliced transcript variants have been found for this gene. Related pseudogenes have been identified on chromosomes 1, 5 and X.

== Structure ==
UQCRB is located on the q arm of chromosome 8 in position 22.1, has 18 exons, and spans 8,958 base pairs. The UQCRB gene produces a 5.9 kDa protein composed of 161 amino acids. The gene product of UQCRB is a subunit of the respiratory chain protein Ubiquinol Cytochrome c Reductase (UQCR, Complex III or Cytochrome bc1 complex; E.C. 1.10.2.2), which consists of the products of one mitochondrially encoded gene, MTCYTB (mitochondrial cytochrome b) and ten nuclear genes: UQCRC1, UQCRC2, Cytochrome c1, UQCRFS1 (Rieske protein), UQCRB, "14kDa protein", UQCRH (cyt c1 Hinge protein), Rieske Protein presequence, "cyt. c1 associated protein", and "Rieske-associated protein". After processing, the cleaved leader sequence of the iron-sulfur protein is retained as subunit 9, giving 11 subunits from 10 genes.

== Function ==
The ubiquinone-binding protein is a nucleus-encoded component of ubiquinol-cytochrome c oxidoreductase (Complex III) in the mitochondrial respiratory chain and plays an important role in electron transfer as a complex of ubiquinone and QP-C. The protein encoded by this gene binds ubiquinone and participates in the transfer of electrons when ubiquinone is bound. It is a target of a protein named natural anti-angiogenic small molecule terpestacin, which enables the role of the ubiquinone-binding protein as cellular oxygen sensors and participants in angiogenesis. This angiogenesis, which is the development of new blood vessels, is hypoxia induced and is facilitated by signaling mediated by mitochondrial ROS (reactive oxygen species). In addition, UQCRB keeps maintenance of complex III.

== Clinical significance ==
Mutations in UQCRB can result in mitochondrial deficiencies and associated disorders. It is majorly associated with a complex III deficiency, a deficiency in an enzyme complex which catalyzes electron transfer from coenzyme Q to cytochrome c in the mitochondrial respiratory chain. A complex III deficiency can result in a highly variable phenotype depending on which tissues are affected. Most frequent clinical manifestations include progressive exercise intolerance and cardiomyopathy. Occasional multisystem disorders accompanied by exercise intolerance may arise as well, in forms of deafness, mental retardation, retinitis pigmentosa, cataract, growth retardation, and epilepsy. Other phenotypes include mitochondrial encephalomyopathy, mitochondrial myopathy, Leber hereditary optic neuropathy, muscle weakness, myoglobinuria, blood acidosis, renal tubulopathy, and more. Complex III deficiency is known to be rare among mitochondrial diseases.

== Interactions ==
UQCRB has binary interactions with 3 proteins, including MAGA4, Q1RN33, and 1A1L1. In addition, SDHAF2 has 69 protein-protein interactions, including COX6B1, CYC1, MYO18A, UHRF1, and others.
