= Stigmatellin =

Names
- Preferred IUPAC name 2-[(3S,4S,5S,6S,7E,9E,11E)-4,6-Dimethoxy-3,5,11-trimethyltrideca-7,9,11-trien-1-yl]-8-hydroxy-5,7-dimethoxy-3-methyl-4H-1-benzopyran-4-one

Identifiers
CAS Number	91682-96-1
3D model (JSmol)	Interactive image
ChEBI	CHEBI:32155
ChEMBL	ChEMBL486556
ChemSpider	394850
ECHA InfoCard	100.149.842
MeSH	Stigmatellin
PubChem CID	447884
CompTox Dashboard (EPA)	DTXSID40903940
- InChI: InChI=1S/C30H42O7/c1-10-18(2)13-11-12-14-22(33-6)21(5)29(36-9)19(3)15-16-23-20(4)27(31)26-24(34-7)17-25(35-8)28(32)30(26)37-23/h10-14,17,19,21-22,29,32H,15-16H2,1-9H3/b13-11+,14-12+,18-10+/t19-,21+,22-,29-/m0/s1 Key: UZHDGDDPOPDJGM-CVOZLMQJSA-N; InChI=1/C30H42O7/c1-10-18(2)13-11-12-14-22(33-6)21(5)29(36-9)19(3)15-16-23-20(4)27(31)26-24(34-7)17-25(35-8)28(32)30(26)37-23/h10-14,17,19,21-22,29,32H,15-16H2,1-9H3/b13-11+,14-12+,18-10+/t19-,21+,22-,29-/m0/s1 Key: UZHDGDDPOPDJGM-CVOZLMQJBZ
- SMILES: O=C\1c2c(O/C(=C/1C)CC[C@H](C)[C@H](OC)[C@H](C)[C@@H](OC)\C=C\C=C\C(=C\C)C)c(O)c(OC)cc2OC

Properties
Chemical formula	C_{30}H_{42}O_{7}
Molar mass	514.65 g/mol
- Except where otherwise noted, data are given for materials in their standard state (at 25 °C [77 °F], 100 kPa). verify (what is ?) Infobox references

Stigmatellin is a potent inhibitor of the quinol oxidation (Qo) site of the cytochrome bc1 complex in mitochondria and the cytochrome b6f complex of thylakoid membranes. At higher concentrations, stigmatellin also inhibits Complex I, as a "Class B" inhibitor of that enzyme.

Stigmatellin is isolated from the myxobacterium Stigmatella aurantica, and contains a 5,7-dimethoxy-8-hydroxychromone aromatic headgroup with a hydrophobic alkenyl chain in position 2. Crystal structures for stigmatellin-inhibited bc1 complex from bovine, avian, yeast (Saccharomyces cerevisiae) and bacterial (Rhodobacter capsulatus, Cereibacter sphaeroides, and Paracoccus denitrificans) sources are available. Stigmatellin binds at the cytochrome b Qo site in the '(heme) bl distal' position, and associates with the Rieske iron-sulfur protein via a hydrogen bond to histidine residue 181 (His-181), a ligand to the [2Fe2S] iron-sulfur cluster of this subunit. This association raises the midpoint potential of the iron-sulfur cluster from 290 to 540 mV and restricts movement of the cytoplasmic domain of the Rieske protein.
