= Aromatic-ring-hydroxylating dioxygenases =

Aromatic-ring-hydroxylating dioxygenases (ARHD) incorporate two atoms of dioxygen (O_{2}) into their substrates in the dihydroxylation reaction. The product is (substituted) cis-1,2-dihydroxycyclohexadiene, which is subsequently converted to (substituted) benzene glycol by a cis-diol dehydrogenase.

A large family of multicomponent mononuclear (non-heme) iron oxygenases has been identified. Components of bacterial aromatic-ring dioxygenases constitute two different functional classes: hydroxylase components and electron transfer components. Hydroxylase components are either (αβ)_{n} or (α)_{n} oligomers. Two prosthetic groups, a Rieske-type [Fe_{2}S_{2}] center and a mononuclear iron, are associated with the α-subunit in the (αβ)_{n}-type enzymes. Electron transfer components are composed of flavoprotein (NADH:ferredoxin oxidoreductase) and Rieske-type [Fe_{2}S_{2}] ferredoxin. In benzoate and toluate 1,2-dioxygenase systems, a single protein containing reductase and Rieske-type ferredoxin domains transfers the electrons from NADH to the hydroxylase component. In the phthalate 4,5-dioxygenase system, phthalate dioxygenase reductase (PDR) has the same function. PDR is a single protein comprising FMN-binding reductase and plant-type ferredoxin domains. Thus, the electron transfer in ARHD systems can be summarised as:

NADH	→	reductase FAD or FMN	→	ferredoxin [Fe_{2}S_{2}]	→	hydroxylase α-subunit [Fe_{2}S_{2}], Fe

== Biochemical classification ==
EC 1.14.12.3 benzene 1,2-dioxygenase

benzene + NADH + H^{+} + O_{2} = cis-cyclohexa-3,5-diene-1,2-diol + NAD^{+}

EC 1.14.12.7 phthalate 4,5-dioxygenase

phthalate + NADH + H^{+} + O_{2} = cis-4,5-dihydroxycyclohexa-1(6),2-diene-1,2-dicarboxylate + NAD^{+}

EC 1.14.12.8 4-sulfobenzoate 3,4-dioxygenase

4-sulfobenzoate + NADH + H^{+} + O_{2} = 3,4-dihydroxybenzoate + sulfite + NAD^{+}

EC 1.14.12.9 4-chlorophenylacetate 3,4-dioxygenase

4-chlorophenylacetate + NADH + H^{+} + O_{2} = 3,4-dihydroxyphenylacetate + chloride + NAD^{+}

EC 1.14.12.10 benzoate 1,2-dioxygenase

benzoate + NADH + H^{+} + O_{2} = 1,2-dihydroxycyclohexa-3,5-diene-1-carboxylate + NAD^{+}

EC 1.14.12.11 toluene dioxygenase

toluene + NADH + H^{+} + O_{2} = (1S,2R)-3-methylcyclohexa-3,5-diene-1,2-diol + NAD^{+}

EC 1.14.12.12 naphthalene 1,2-dioxygenase

naphthalene + NADH + H^{+} + O_{2} = (1R,2S)-1,2-dihydronaphthalene-1,2-diol + NAD^{+}

EC 1.14.12.15 terephthalate 1,2-dioxygenase

terephthalate + NADH + H^{+} + O_{2} = (1R,6S)-dihydroxycyclohexa-2,4-diene-1,4-dicarboxylate + NAD^{+}

EC 1.14.12.18 biphenyl 2,3-dioxygenase

biphenyl + NADH + H^{+} + O_{2} = (1S,2R)-3-phenylcyclohexa-3,5-diene-1,2-diol + NAD^{+}

== Structure ==
The crystal structure of the hydroxylase component of naphthalene 1,2-dioxygenase from Pseudomonas has been determined. The protein is an (αβ)_{3} hexamer. The β-subunit belongs to the α+β class. It has no prosthetic groups and its role in catalysis is unknown. The α-subunit can be divided into two domains: a Rieske domain that contains the [Fe_{2}S_{2}] center and the catalytic domain that contains the active site mononuclear iron. The Rieske domain (residues 38-158) consists of four β-sheets. The overall fold is very similar to that of the soluble fragment of the Rieske protein from bovine heart mitochondrial cytochrome bc_{1} complex. In the [Fe_{2}S_{2}] center, Fe1 is coordinated by two cysteine residues (Cys-81 and Cys-101) while Fe2 is coordinated by N^{δ} atoms of two histidine residues (His-83 and His-104). The catalytic domain belongs to the α+β class and is dominated by a nine-stranded antiparallel β-sheet. The iron of the active site is located at the bottom of a narrow channel, approximately 15 Å from the protein surface. The mononuclear iron is coordinated by His-208, His-213, Asp-362 (bidentate) and a water molecule. The geometry can be described as a distorted octahedral with one ligand missing. The structure of the hexamer suggests cooperativity between adjacent α-subunits, where electrons from the [Fe_{2}S_{2}] center in one α-subunit (A) are transferred to the mononuclear iron in the adjacent α-subunit (B) through Asp_{B}-205, which is hydrogen-bonded to His_{A}-104 of the Rieske center and His_{B}-208 of the active site.
