= Steroid 9alpha-monooxygenase =

steroid 9-alpha-monooxygenase
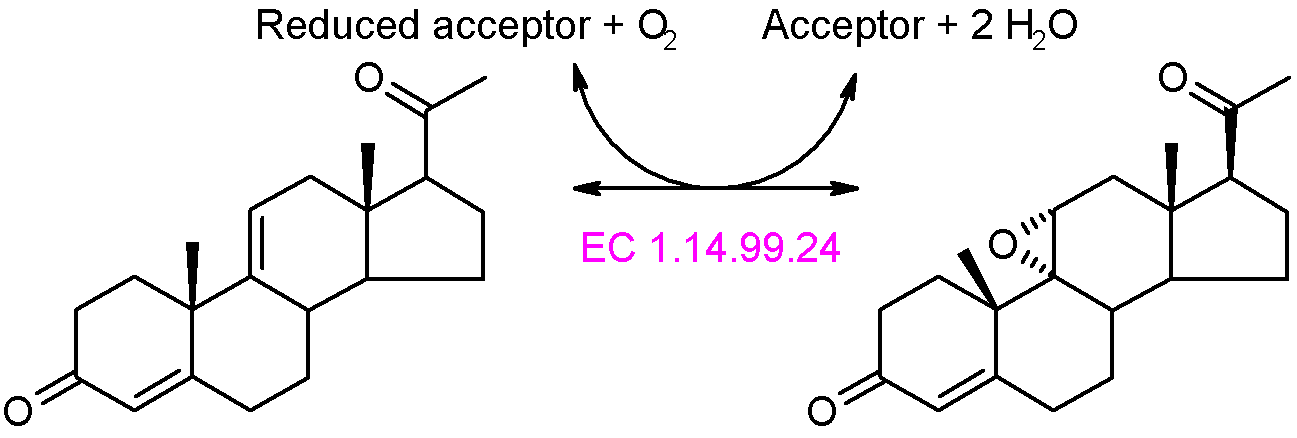
- Steroid 9alpha-monooxygenase reaction

Identifiers
- EC no.: 1.14.99.24
- CAS no.: 82869-33-8

Databases
- BRENDA: enzyme data
- ExPASy: NiceZyme view
- KEGG: enzyme entry
- MetaCyc: metabolic pathway
- Rhea: reactions
- PDB structures: RCSB PDB PDBe PDBsum
- Gene Ontology: AmiGO / QuickGO
Search
- PMC: articles
- PubMed: articles
- NCBI: proteins

In enzymology, a steroid 9alpha-monooxygenase (EC 1.14.99.24) is an enzyme that catalyzes the chemical reaction

pregna-4,9(11)-diene-3,20-dione + AH_{2} + O_{2} $\rightleftharpoons$ 9,11alpha-epoxypregn-4-ene-3,20-dione + A + H_{2}O

The 3 substrates of this enzyme are pregna-4,9(11)-diene-3,20-dione, an electron acceptor AH_{2}, and O_{2}, whereas its 3 products are 9,11alpha-epoxypregn-4-ene-3,20-dione, the reduction product A, and H_{2}O.

This enzyme belongs to the family of oxidoreductases, specifically those acting on paired donors, with O2 as oxidant and incorporation or reduction of oxygen. The oxygen incorporated need not be derive from O miscellaneous. The systematic name of this enzyme class is steroid,hydrogen-donor:oxygen oxidoreductase (9-epoxidizing). This enzyme is also called steroid 9alpha-hydroxylase. It has 2 cofactors: FMN, and Iron-sulfur.
