= Ferredoxin—nitrate reductase =

Class of enzymes

ferredoxin—nitrate reductase

Identifiers
- EC no.: 1.7.7.2
- CAS no.: 60382-69-6

Databases
- IntEnz: IntEnz view
- BRENDA: BRENDA entry
- ExPASy: NiceZyme view
- KEGG: KEGG entry
- MetaCyc: metabolic pathway
- PRIAM: profile
- PDB structures: RCSB PDB PDBe PDBsum
- Gene Ontology: AmiGO / QuickGO
Search
- PMC: articles
- PubMed: articles
- NCBI: proteins

In enzymology, a ferredoxin—nitrate reductase (EC 1.7.7.2) is an enzyme that catalyzes the chemical reaction

nitrite + H_{2}O + 2 oxidized ferredoxin $\rightleftharpoons$ nitrate + 2 reduced ferredoxin + 2 H^{+}

The 3 substrates of this enzyme are nitrite, H_{2}O, and oxidized ferredoxin, whereas its 3 products are nitrate, reduced ferredoxin, and H^{+}. Nitrate Reductase is an essential enzyme present in most biological systems such as green plants, certain fungi, yeasts and bacteria that aids in the reduction of nitrate to ammonium.

This enzyme belongs to the family of oxidoreductases, specifically those acting on other nitrogenous compounds as donors with an iron-sulfur protein as acceptor. The systematic name of this enzyme class is nitrite:ferredoxin oxidoreductase. Other names in common use include assimilatory nitrate reductase, nitrate (ferredoxin) reductase, and assimilatory ferredoxin-nitrate reductase. This enzyme participates in nitrogen metabolism. It has 4 cofactors: iron, Sulfur, Molybdenum, and Iron-sulfur. The Iron-Sulfur cluster ([4FE-4S]) in this enzyme has a variety of different functions that contribute to the growth of aerobic cells. Some of the functions include but are not limited to the following: involved in photosynthetic processes, electron-transfer reactions and the binding of certain substrates, resulting in activation.

== Structural studies ==
As of late 2007, only one structure has been solved for this class of enzymes, with the PDB accession code 1PFD.
