= UQCR11 =

Protein-coding gene in the species Homo sapiens

Identifiers
- Aliases: UQCR11, 0710008D09Rik, QCR10, UQCR, ubiquinol-cytochrome c reductase, complex III subunit XI
- External IDs: OMIM: 609711; MGI: 1913844; GeneCards: UQCR11

Gene location (Human)
Chr.	Chromosome 19 (human)
Band	19p13.3	Start	1,597,169 bp
Band	19p13.3	End	1,605,473 bp

Gene location (Mouse)
Chr.	Chromosome 10 (mouse)
Band	10|10 C1	Start	80,238,831 bp
Band	10|10 C1	End	80,242,664 bp
RNA expression pattern
Bgee	Human / Mouse (ortholog); Top expressed in: apex of heart; right auricle of heart; muscle of thigh; mucosa of transverse colon; gastrocnemius muscle; right adrenal gland; right lobe of liver; muscle layer of sigmoid colon; left adrenal cortex; cingulate gyrus / Top expressed in: right kidney; white adipose tissue; proximal tubule; striatum of neuraxis; adrenal gland; muscle tissue; quadriceps femoris muscle; skeletal muscle tissue; urinary bladder; muscle of thigh; More reference expression data
BioGPS	n/a
Gene ontology
Molecular function	electron transfer activity; ubiquinol-cytochrome-c reductase activity
Cellular component	integral component of membrane; respirasome; membrane; mitochondrion; mitochondrial inner membrane
Biological process	generation of precursor metabolites and energy; electron transport chain; mitochondrial electron transport, ubiquinol to cytochrome c
Sources:Amigo / QuickGO
Orthologs
Databases	NCBI: entry; OMA: entry
Species	Human	Mouse
Entrez	10975	66594
Ensembl	ENSG00000127540	ENSMUSG00000020163
UniProt	O14957	Q9CPX8
RefSeq (mRNA)	NM_006830	NM_025650
RefSeq (protein)	NP_006821	NP_079926
Location (UCSC)	Chr 19: 1.6 – 1.61 Mb	Chr 10: 80.24 – 80.24 Mb
PubMed search
- Wikidata
View/Edit Human	View/Edit Mouse

UQCR11 (ubiquinol-cytochrome c reductase, complex III sub-unit XI) is a protein that in humans is encoded by the UQCR11 gene. UQCR11 is the smallest known component of Complex III in the mitochondrial respiratory chain.

== Structure ==
The UQCR11 gene, located on the p arm of chromosome 19 in position 13.3, is made up of 3 exons and is 8,329 base pairs in length. The UQCR11 protein weighs 6.6 kDa and is composed of 56 amino acids. This gene encodes the smallest known component of the ubiquinol-cytochrome c reductase complex, which is also known as Complex III and is part of the mitochondrial respiratory chain. In vertebrates, Complex III contains 11 sub-units: 3 respiratory sub-units, 2 core proteins and 6 low-molecular weight proteins. Proteobacterial complexes may contain as few as three sub-units.

== Function ==
The UQCR11 protein may function as a binding factor for the iron-sulfur protein in Complex III, which is ubiquitous in human cells. Complex III catalyzes the chemical reaction

QH_{2} + 2 ferricytochrome c $\rightleftharpoons$ Q + 2 ferrocytochrome c + 2 H^{+}

Thus, the two substrates of Complex III are dihydroquinone (QH2) and ferri- (Fe^{3+}) cytochrome c, whereas its 3 products are quinone (Q), ferro- (Fe^{2+}) cytochrome c, and H^{+}. This complex belongs to the family of oxidoreductases, specifically those acting on diphenols and related substances as donor with a cytochrome as acceptor. This enzyme participates in oxidative phosphorylation. It has four cofactors: cytochrome c_{1}, cytochrome b-562, cytochrome b-566 and a 2-Iron ferredoxin of the Rieske type.
