= UQCRQ =

Protein-coding gene in the species Homo sapiens

Identifiers
- Aliases: UQCRQ, MC3DN4, QCR8, QP-C, QPC, UQCR7, ubiquinol-cytochrome c reductase complex III subunit VII
- External IDs: OMIM: 612080; MGI: 107807; GeneCards: UQCRQ

Gene location (Human)
Chr.	Chromosome 5 (human)
Band	5q31.1	Start	132,866,630 bp
Band	5q31.1	End	132,868,847 bp

Gene location (Mouse)
Chr.	Chromosome 11 (mouse)
Band	11|11 B1.3	Start	53,318,749 bp
Band	11|11 B1.3	End	53,321,658 bp
RNA expression pattern
Bgee	Human / Mouse (ortholog); Top expressed in: apex of heart; body of tongue; left ventricle; renal medulla; mucosa of transverse colon; vena cava; lateral nuclear group of thalamus; mucosa of pharynx; right auricle of heart; gastrocnemius muscle / Top expressed in: interventricular septum; choroid plexus of fourth ventricle; right kidney; plantaris muscle; muscle of thigh; Ileal epithelium; extensor digitorum longus muscle; cardiac muscle tissue of left ventricle; soleus muscle; yolk sac; More reference expression data
BioGPS	n/a
Gene ontology
Molecular function	ubiquinol-cytochrome-c reductase activity
Cellular component	mitochondrial inner membrane; respirasome; mitochondrion; membrane; mitochondrial respiratory chain complex III
Biological process	pons development; pyramidal neuron development; hippocampus development; cerebellar Purkinje cell layer development; midbrain development; thalamus development; hypothalamus development; subthalamus development; mitochondrial electron transport, ubiquinol to cytochrome c
Sources:Amigo / QuickGO
Orthologs
Databases	NCBI: entry; OMA: entry
Species	Human	Mouse
Entrez	27089	22272
Ensembl	ENSG00000164405	ENSMUSG00000044894
UniProt	O14949	Q9CQ69
RefSeq (mRNA)	NM_014402	NM_025352; NM_001326614
RefSeq (protein)	NP_055217	NP_001313543; NP_079628
Location (UCSC)	Chr 5: 132.87 – 132.87 Mb	Chr 11: 53.32 – 53.32 Mb
PubMed search
- Wikidata
View/Edit Human	View/Edit Mouse

Ubiquinol-cytochrome c reductase, complex III subunit VII, 9.5kDa is a protein that in humans is encoded by the UQCRQ gene. This ubiqinone-binding protein is a subunit of mitochondrial Complex III in the electron transport chain. A mutation in the UQCRQ gene has been shown to cause severe neurological disorders. Infection by Trypanosoma cruzi can cause oxidative modification of this protein in cardiac muscle tissue.

== Structure ==
The UQCRQ gene is located on the q arm of chromosome 5 in position 31.1 and spans 2,217 base pairs. The gene produces a 9.9 kDa protein composed of 82 amino acids. This protein is transmembranous, with more mass on the matrix side of the membrane.

== Function ==
This gene encodes a ubiquinone-binding protein of low molecular mass. It is a small core-associated protein and a subunit of ubiquinol-cytochrome c reductase complex III, which is part of the mitochondrial respiratory chain.

== Clinical significance ==
Variants of UQCRQ have been associated with complex III deficiency. One set of twenty consanguineous cases of a Ser45Phe mutation in the UQCRQ gene, and a different homozygous 4-bp deletion at p. 338-341, have been linked to this disease. In an inbred Israeli Bedouin family, the mutations, inherited in an autosomal recessive pattern, displayed the phenotype of mitochondrial Complex III deficiency, nuclear type 4, accompanied by severe neurological symptoms. Other symptoms of complex III deficiency linked to these mutations have included hypoglycemia, lactic acidosis, and hypotonia.

In another study of cardiac muscle tissue in individuals infected by Trypanosoma cruzi, an oxidative modification of the UQCRQ subunit was present, along with oxidative modification of subunits UQCRC1 and UQCRC2 of the same core complex and UQCRH and CYC1 of the neighboring subcomplex.

== Interactions ==
The protein encoded by UQCRQ has protein-protein interactions with UQCRC1, OPTN, ERCC8, GRINL1A, Dctn1, K8.1, XRCC3, PML, RAB7A, HNRNPA1L2, CDC73, NLRP3, HAUS2, TMEM248, and GOLT1B.
