= Cytochrome C1 =

Protein encoded by the CYC1 gene

CYC1
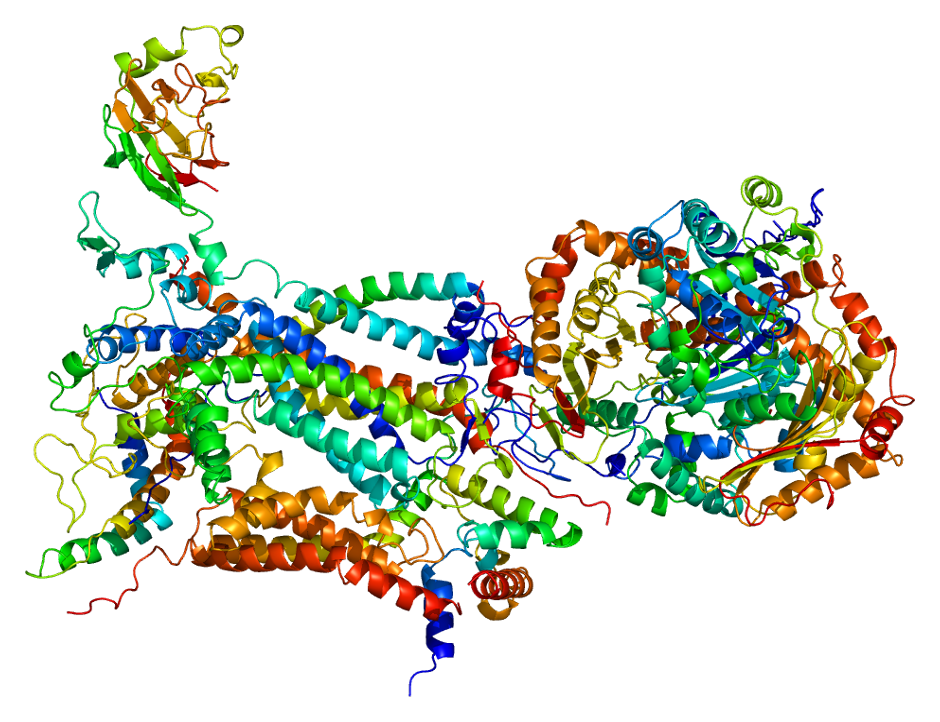

Identifiers
- Aliases: CYC1, MC3DN6, UQCR4, cytochrome c1
- External IDs: OMIM: 123980; MGI: 1913695; GeneCards: CYC1
Enzyme activity
| EC # | BRENDA | ExPASy | KEGG | MetaCyc |
|---|---|---|---|---|
| 7.1.1.8 | ↗ | ↗ | ↗ | ↗ |

Gene location (Human)
| Chr. | Chromosome 8 (human) |
| Band | 8q24.3 | Start | 144,095,039 bp |
| Band | 8q24.3 | End | 144,097,525 bp |

Gene location (Mouse)
| Chr. | Chromosome 15 (mouse) |
| Band | 15|15 D3 | Start | 76,227,723 bp |
| Band | 15|15 D3 | End | 76,230,460 bp |
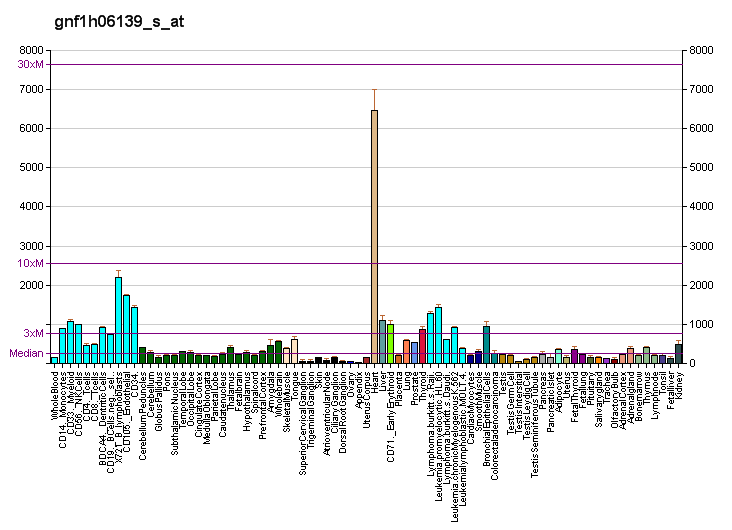

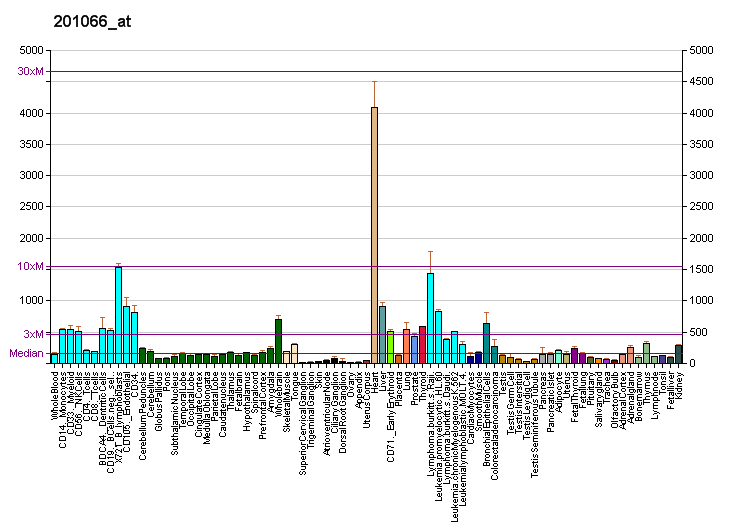
RNA expression pattern
| Bgee | Human / Mouse (ortholog); Top expressed in: apex of heart; left ventricle; myocardium of left ventricle; mucosa of transverse colon; muscle of thigh; thoracic diaphragm; body of tongue; gastrocnemius muscle; right auricle of heart; right ventricle / Top expressed in: Ileal epithelium; interventricular septum; extraocular muscle; thoracic diaphragm; extensor digitorum longus muscle; masseter muscle; plantaris muscle; digastric muscle; myocardium of ventricle; soleus muscle; More reference expression data |
| BioGPS | More reference expression data |
Gene ontology
| Molecular function | electron transfer activity; heme binding; metal ion binding |
| Cellular component | integral component of membrane; respirasome; nucleus; mitochondrion; mitochondrial inner membrane; membrane; mitochondrial respiratory chain complex III |
| Biological process | response to glucagon; mitochondrial electron transport, ubiquinol to cytochrome c; mitochondrial ATP synthesis coupled proton transport |
Sources:Amigo / QuickGO
Orthologs
| Databases | NCBI: entry; OMA: entry |
| Species | Human | Mouse |
| Entrez | 1537 | 66445 |
| Ensembl | ENSG00000179091 | ENSMUSG00000022551 |
| UniProt | P08574 | Q9D0M3 |
| RefSeq (mRNA) | NM_001916 | NM_025567 |
| RefSeq (protein) | NP_001907 | NP_079843 |
| Location (UCSC) | Chr 8: 144.1 – 144.1 Mb | Chr 15: 76.23 – 76.23 Mb |
| PubMed search |
- Wikidata
| View/Edit Human | View/Edit Mouse |

Cytochrome C1

Identifiers
- Symbol: CYC1
- Alt. symbols: UQCR4, MC3DN6
- Alt. names: Complex III subunit 4, Ubiquinol-cytochrome-c reductase complex cytochrome c1 subunit
- NCBI gene: 1537
- HGNC: 2579
- OMIM: 123980
- RefSeq: NM_001916.4
- UniProt: P08574

Other data
- Locus: Chr. 8 243
Search for
- Structures: Swiss-model
- Domains: InterPro

Cytochrome C1 (CYC1), also known as Complex III subunit 4 and UQCR4, is a heme-containing protein that is part of the respiratory electron transport chain. In humans, it is encoded by the cyc1 gene. It is a subunit of Complex III (coenzyme Q:cytochrome C oxidoreductase, also known as the cytochrome bc_{1} complex), which accepts electrons from the Rieske protein and transfers them to cytochrome c in the mitochondrial respiratory chain. It is formed in the cytosol and targeted to the mitochondrial intermembrane space. Mutations in this gene may cause mitochondrial complex III deficiency, nuclear, type 6 (MC3DN6). Cytochrome C1 belongs to the cytochrome c family of proteins.

== Structure ==
=== Gene ===
The cyc1 gene is located on the q arm of chromosome 8 in position 24.3 and has 8 exons. The cyc1 gene produces a 13.5 kDa protein composed of 130 amino acids. CYC1 belongs to the cytochrome c family.

=== Protein ===
CYC1 is a phosphoprotein which binds heme groups as ligands. It consists of a helix domain, a signal peptide domain, and a transmembrane domain, and contains 9 alpha helices, 5 beta strands, and 3 turns. The transmembrane protein passes through the inner mitochondrial membrane once and the majority of the protein is found on the intermembrane side. CYC1 contains covalent heme binding sites at positions 121 and 124 and heme axial ligand iron-metal binding sites at positions 125 and 244.

== Function ==
Cytochrome C1 plays a role in the electron transfer during oxidative phosphorylation. As an iron-sulfur protein approaches the bc_{1} complex, it accepts an electron from the cytochrome b subunit, then undergoes a conformational change to attach to cytochrome c1. There, the electron carried by the iron-sulfur protein is transferred to the heme carried by cytochrome c1. This electron is then transferred to a heme carried by cytochrome c. This creates a reduced species of cytochrome c, which separates from the bc_{1} complex and moves to the last enzyme in the electron transport chain, cytochrome c oxidase (Complex IV).

== Species ==
cyc1 is a human gene that is conserved in chimpanzee, Rhesus monkey, dog, cow, mouse, rat, zebrafish, fruit fly, mosquito, C. elegans, S. cerevisiae, K. lactis, E. gossypii, S. pombe, N. crassa, A. thaliana, rice, and frog. There are orthologs of CYC1 in 137 known organisms.

In its structure and function, the cytochrome bc_{1} complex bears extensive analogy to the cytochrome b6f complex of chloroplasts and cyanobacteria; cytochrome c1 plays an analogous role to cytochrome f, despite their different structures.

== Clinical relevance ==
Mutations in the cyc1 gene are associated with Mitochondrial Complex III deficiency, nuclear type 6 (MC3DN6), which is an autosomal-recessive disease. This results in a defect in Complex III, leading to instability, which decreases its activity in oxidative phosphorylation. The disease symptoms include early childhood onset of severe lactic acidosis and ketoacidosis, usually in response to infection. Insulin-responsive hyperglycemia is also present, but psychomotor development appears normal. Pathogenic mutations have included c.288G>T p.Trp96Cys, and c.643C>T p.Leu215Phe.

== Interactions ==
CYC1 has 78 protein-protein interactions, with 72 of them being co-complex interactions. CYC1 is one of 11 subunits of the bc_{1} complex, along with cytochrome b, UQCRFS1, the core proteins UQCRC1 and UQCRC2, and the low-molecular weight proteins UQCRH, UQCRB, UQCRQ, UQCR10, UQCR11, as well as an additional cleavage product of UQCRFS1. Additionally, CCP1, CDKA-1, and CDKB1-1 have also been found to interact with CYC1.
