= UQCRH =

Protein-coding gene in humans

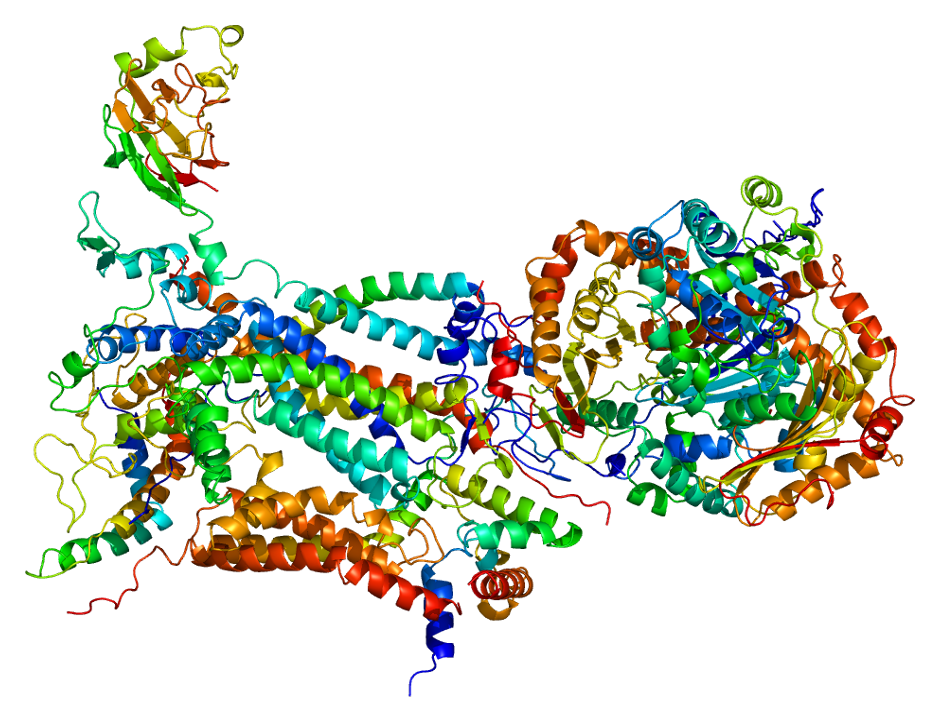

Identifiers
- Aliases: UQCRH, QCR6, UQCR8, ubiquinol-cytochrome c reductase hinge protein
- External IDs: OMIM: 613844; MGI: 3641869; GeneCards: UQCRH

Gene location (Human)
Chr.	Chromosome 1 (human)
Band	1p33	Start	46,303,698 bp
Band	1p33	End	46,316,776 bp
RNA expression pattern
Bgee	Human / Mouse (ortholog); Top expressed in: cerebellar vermis; left ventricle; apex of heart; right auricle of heart; primary visual cortex; superior frontal gyrus; dorsolateral prefrontal cortex; prefrontal cortex; cerebellar hemisphere; Brodmann area 9 / n/a; More reference expression data
BioGPS	n/a
Gene ontology
Molecular function	protein binding; ubiquinol-cytochrome-c reductase activity
Cellular component	mitochondrial inner membrane; respirasome; membrane; mitochondrion; mitochondrial respirasome; mitochondrial respiratory chain complex III
Biological process	aerobic dissimilation; oxidative phosphorylation; proton transmembrane transport; mitochondrial electron transport, ubiquinol to cytochrome c
Sources:Amigo / QuickGO
Orthologs
Databases	NCBI: entry; OMA: entry
Species	Human	Mouse
Entrez	7388	100042918
Ensembl	ENSG00000173660	ENSMUSG00000037438
UniProt	P07919	n/a
RefSeq (mRNA)	NM_006004; NM_001297565; NM_001297566	n/a
RefSeq (protein)	NP_001284494; NP_001284495; NP_005995	n/a
Location (UCSC)	Chr 1: 46.3 – 46.32 Mb	n/a
PubMed search
- Wikidata
View/Edit Human	View/Edit Mouse

Cytochrome b-c1 complex subunit 6, mitochondrial is a protein that in humans is encoded by the UQCRH gene.

Its gene product is a subunit of the respiratory chain protein Ubiquinol Cytochrome c Reductase (UQCR, Complex III or Cytochrome bc1 complex; E.C. 1.10.2.2), which consists of the products of one mitochondrially encoded gene, MTCYTB (mitochondrial cytochrome b) and ten nuclear genes: UQCRC1, UQCRC2, Cytochrome c1, UQCRFS1 (Rieske protein), UQCRB, "11kDa protein", UQCRH (cyt c1 Hinge protein), Rieske Protein presequence, "cyt. c1 associated protein", and "Rieske-associated protein".
