= UQCRC1 =

Protein-coding gene in the species Homo sapiens

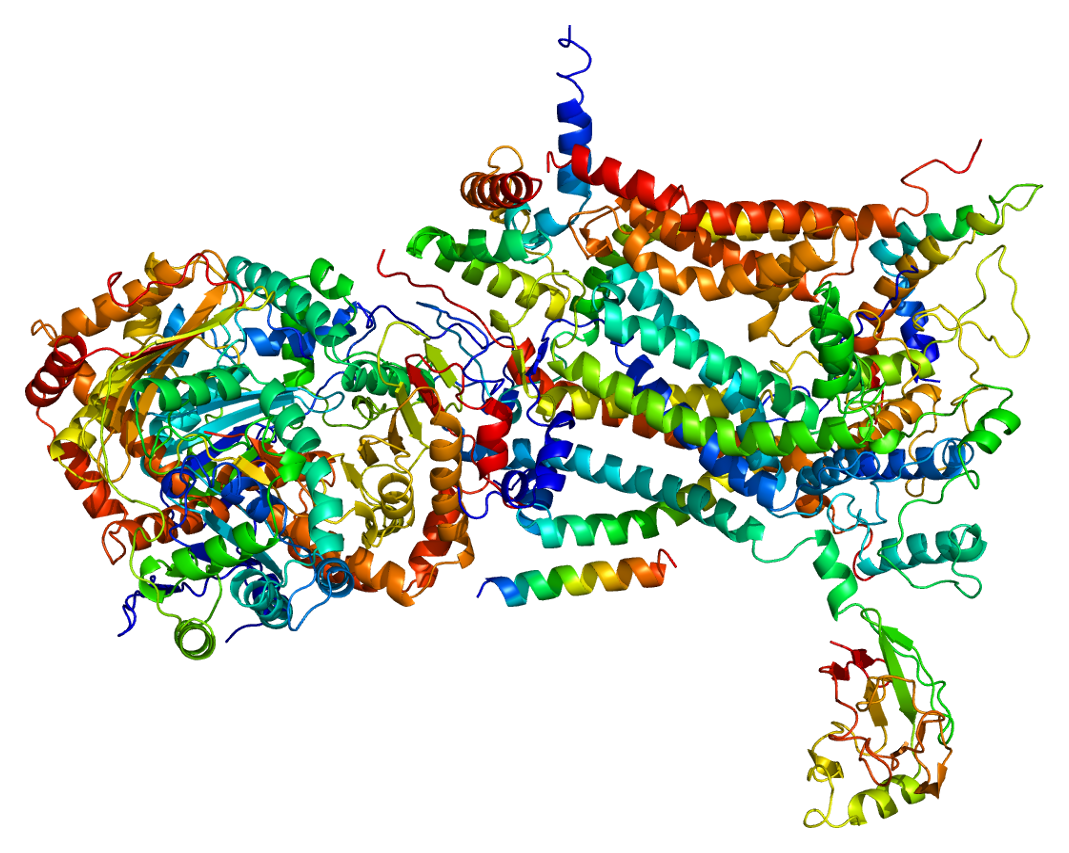

Identifiers
- Aliases: UQCRC1, D3S3191, QCR1, UQCR1, ubiquinol-cytochrome c reductase core protein I, ubiquinol-cytochrome c reductase core protein 1, PKNPY
- External IDs: OMIM: 191328; MGI: 107876; GeneCards: UQCRC1

Gene location (Human)
Chr.	Chromosome 3 (human)
Band	3p21.31	Start	48,599,002 bp
Band	3p21.31	End	48,610,976 bp

Gene location (Mouse)
Chr.	Chromosome 9 (mouse)
Band	9 F2|9 59.63 cM	Start	108,765,701 bp
Band	9 F2|9 59.63 cM	End	108,778,691 bp
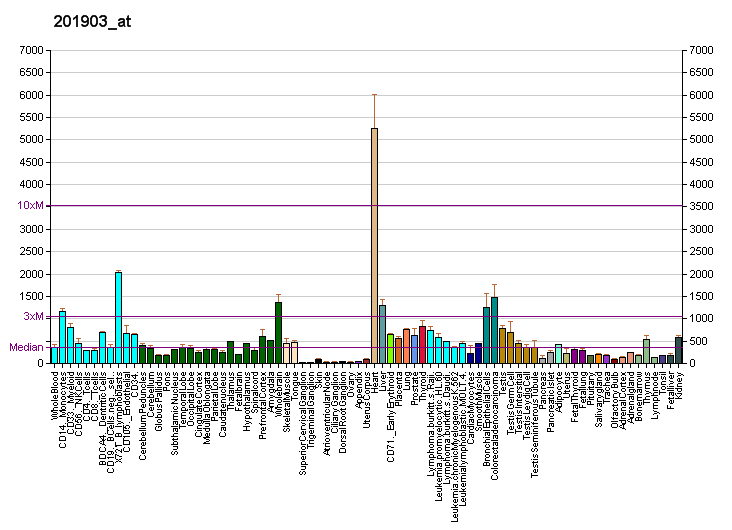
RNA expression pattern
Bgee	Human / Mouse (ortholog); Top expressed in: apex of heart; left ventricle; right ventricle; triceps brachii muscle; myocardium of left ventricle; gastrocnemius muscle; muscle of thigh; mucosa of transverse colon; right auricle of heart; vastus lateralis muscle / Top expressed in: proximal tubule; heart; right kidney; muscle tissue; muscle of thigh; skeletal muscle tissue; quadriceps femoris muscle; human kidney; neural layer of retina; duodenum; More reference expression data
BioGPS	More reference expression data
Gene ontology
Molecular function	ubiquinol-cytochrome-c reductase activity; protein-containing complex binding; zinc ion binding; metal ion binding; catalytic activity; metalloendopeptidase activity; ubiquitin protein ligase binding
Cellular component	mitochondrial respiratory chain complex III; membrane; myelin sheath; mitochondrion; mitochondrial respirasome; mitochondrial inner membrane; respirasome; cytosol
Biological process	protein processing; response to activity; aerobic dissimilation; oxidative phosphorylation; response to alkaloid; mitochondrial electron transport, ubiquinol to cytochrome c; proton transmembrane transport; proteolysis
Sources:Amigo / QuickGO
Orthologs
Databases	NCBI: entry; OMA: entry
Species	Human	Mouse
Entrez	7384	22273
Ensembl	ENSG00000010256	ENSMUSG00000025651
UniProt	P31930	Q9CZ13
RefSeq (mRNA)	NM_003365	NM_025407
RefSeq (protein)	NP_003356	NP_079683
Location (UCSC)	Chr 3: 48.6 – 48.61 Mb	Chr 9: 108.77 – 108.78 Mb
PubMed search
- Wikidata
View/Edit Human	View/Edit Mouse

Cytochrome b-c1 complex subunit 1, mitochondrial is a protein that in humans is encoded by the UQCRC1 gene.

Its gene product is a subunit of the respiratory chain protein Ubiquinol Cytochrome c Reductase (UQCR, Complex III or Cytochrome bc1 complex), which consists of the products of one mitochondrially encoded gene, MTCYTB (mitochondrial cytochrome b) and ten nuclear genes: UQCRC1, UQCRC2, Cytochrome c1, UQCRFS1 (Rieske protein), UQCRB, "11kDa protein", UQCRH (cyt c1 Hinge protein), Rieske Protein presequence, "cyt. c1 associated protein", and Rieske-associated protein.
