= GOLT1B =

Protein-coding gene in the species Homo sapiens

Identifiers
- Aliases: GOLT1B, GCT2, GOT1, GOT1B, YMR292W, CGI-141, golgi transport 1B
- External IDs: OMIM: 615078; MGI: 1914214; HomoloGene: 41102; GeneCards: GOLT1B; OMA:GOLT1B - orthologs

Gene location (Human)
Chr.	Chromosome 12 (human)
Band	12p12.1	Start	21,501,781 bp
Band	12p12.1	End	21,518,408 bp

Gene location (Mouse)
Chr.	Chromosome 6 (mouse)
Band	6|6 G2	Start	142,332,947 bp
Band	6|6 G2	End	142,349,584 bp
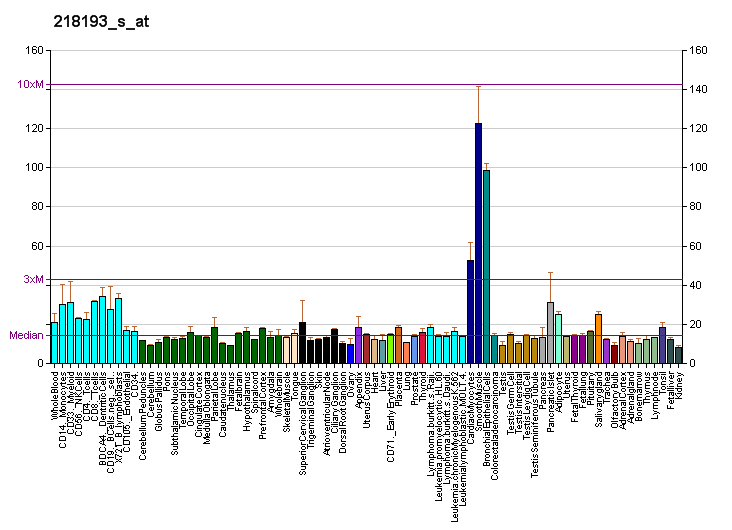
RNA expression pattern
Bgee	Human / Mouse (ortholog); Top expressed in: secondary oocyte; tibia; islet of Langerhans; endothelial cell; palpebral conjunctiva; pars reticulata; external globus pallidus; cartilage tissue; pars compacta; synovial joint / Top expressed in: genital tubercle; ascending aorta; aortic valve; tail of embryo; embryo; otic placode; embryo; saccule; neural tube; decidua; More reference expression data
BioGPS	More reference expression data
Gene ontology
Molecular function	signal transducer activity
Cellular component	integral component of membrane; Golgi membrane; Golgi apparatus; endoplasmic reticulum; membrane
Biological process	protein transport; positive regulation of I-kappaB kinase/NF-kappaB signaling; vesicle-mediated transport; signal transduction; transport
Sources:Amigo / QuickGO
Orthologs
Species	Human	Mouse
Entrez	51026	66964
Ensembl	ENSG00000111711	ENSMUSG00000030245
UniProt	Q9Y3E0	Q9CR60
RefSeq (mRNA)	NM_016072	NM_025872
RefSeq (protein)	NP_057156	NP_080148
Location (UCSC)	Chr 12: 21.5 – 21.52 Mb	Chr 6: 142.33 – 142.35 Mb
PubMed search
- Wikidata
View/Edit Human	View/Edit Mouse

Vesicle transport protein GOT1B is a protein that in humans is encoded by the GOLT1B gene.

Got1p is a protein that aides in vesicle transport through the Golgi apparatus of the cell. Got1p has a calculated mass of 15.4 kDa and consists of 138 residues. It is believed that the protein is a tetra-spanning membrane protein, and is evolutionarily conserved. Homologes of the protein have been found in Caenorhabditis elegans, Plasmodium falciparum, and in mammals. GOT1 is normally associated closely with Sf2p (encoded by sft2), which is another protein of similar function. In vivo, It has been found that the removal of these two proteins results in defects in endosome-Golgi traffic and ER-Golgi traffic. In vitro, the removal of got1 specifically, results in a defect in ER-Golgi transport in relation to vesicle tethering to Golgi membranes. The exact contribution that the protein has towards vesicle tethering is still a mystery, however, it is suspected that Got1p is involved in the release of Ca^{2+} in the Golgi membranes, causing ion channels associated with vesicle tethering to be affected.
