= COX6B1 =

Protein-coding gene in the species Homo sapiens

Identifiers
- Aliases: COX6B1, COX6B, COXG, COXVIb1, cytochrome c oxidase subunit 6B1, MC4DN7
- External IDs: OMIM: 124089; MGI: 107460; GeneCards: COX6B1

Gene location (Human)
Chr.	Chromosome 19 (human)
Band	19q13.12	Start	35,648,323 bp
Band	19q13.12	End	35,658,782 bp
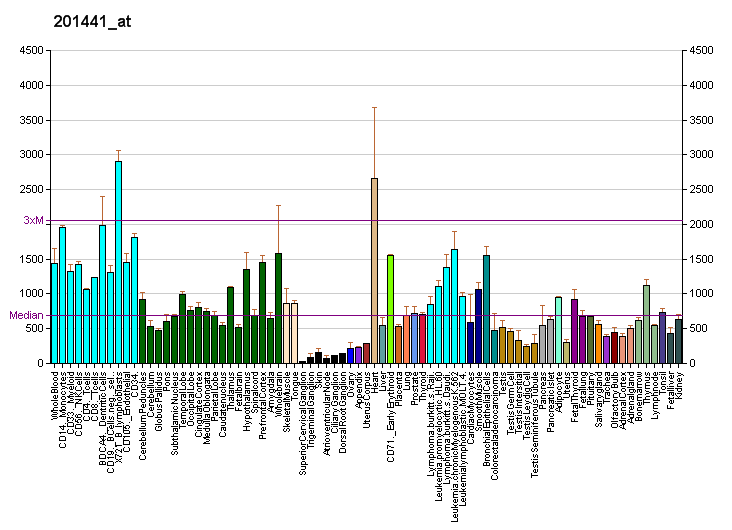
RNA expression pattern
Bgee	Human / Mouse (ortholog); Top expressed in: apex of heart; left ventricle; right ventricle; right auricle of heart; mucosa of transverse colon; muscle of thigh; rectum; triceps brachii muscle; gastrocnemius muscle; Brodmann area 9 / n/a; More reference expression data
BioGPS	More reference expression data
Gene ontology
Molecular function	cytochrome-c oxidase activity; protein binding
Cellular component	mitochondrial inner membrane; mitochondrial intermembrane space; mitochondrion; respiratory chain complex IV
Biological process	substantia nigra development; mitochondrial electron transport, cytochrome c to oxygen; proton transmembrane transport; electron transport chain
Sources:Amigo / QuickGO
Orthologs
Databases	NCBI: entry; OMA: entry
Species	Human	Mouse
Entrez	1340	110323
Ensembl	ENSG00000126267	ENSMUSG00000036751
UniProt	P14854	P56391
RefSeq (mRNA)	NM_001863	NM_025628
RefSeq (protein)	NP_001854	NP_079904
Location (UCSC)	Chr 19: 35.65 – 35.66 Mb	n/a
PubMed search
- Wikidata
View/Edit Human	View/Edit Mouse

Cytochrome c oxidase subunit 6B1 is an enzyme that in humans is encoded by the COX6B1 gene. Cytochrome c oxidase 6B1 is a subunit of the cytochrome c oxidase complex, also known as Complex IV, the last enzyme in the mitochondrial electron transport chain. Mutations of the COX6B1 gene are associated with severe infantile encephalomyopathy and mitochondrial complex IV deficiency (MT-C4D).

== Structure ==
The COX6B1 gene, located on the q arm of chromosome 19 in position 13.1, contains 4 exons and is 10,562 base pairs in length. The COX6B1 protein weighs 10 kDa and is composed of 86 amino acids. The protein is a subunit of Complex IV, a heteromeric complex consisting of 3 catalytic subunits encoded by mitochondrial genes, and multiple structural subunits encoded by nuclear genes.

== Function ==
Cytochrome c oxidase (COX), the terminal enzyme of the mitochondrial respiratory chain, catalyzes the electron transfer from reduced cytochrome c to oxygen. It is a heteromeric complex consisting of 3 catalytic subunits encoded by mitochondrial genes and multiple structural subunits encoded by nuclear genes. The mitochondrially-encoded subunits function in electron transfer, and the nuclear-encoded subunits may be involved in the regulation and assembly of the complex. This nuclear gene encodes subunit VIb. Three pseudogenes COX6BP-1, COX6BP-2 and COX6BP-3 have been found on chromosomes 7, 17 and 22q13.1-13.2, respectively.

Summary reaction:

4 Fe^{2+}-cytochrome c + 8 H^{+}_{in} + O_{2} → 4 Fe^{3+}-cytochrome c + 2 H_{2}O + 4 H^{+}_{out}

== Clinical significance ==
Mutations affecting the COX6B1 gene are associated with mitochondrial complex IV deficiency (MT-C4D), a disorder of the mitochondrial respiratory chain with heterogeneous clinical manifestations, ranging from isolated myopathy to severe multisystem disease affecting several tissues and organs. Features include hypertrophic cardiomyopathy, hepatomegaly and liver dysfunction, hypotonia, muscle weakness, exercise intolerance, developmental delay, delayed motor development, and mental retardation. Some affected individuals manifest a fatal hypertrophic cardiomyopathy resulting in neonatal death. A subset of patients manifest Leigh's syndrome. A COX6B1 R20C missense mutation has been linked to complex IV deficiency with encephalomyopathy, hydrocephalus, and hypertrophic cardiomyopathy.

== Interactions ==
COX6B1 has been shown to have 548 binary protein-protein interactions including 547 co-complex interactions.
