= Coenzyme Q – cytochrome c reductase =

Class of enzymes

Cytochrome b-c1 complex
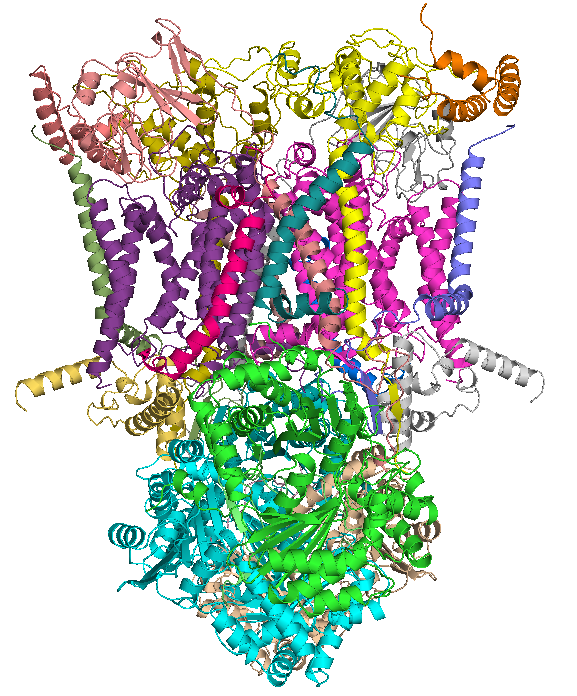
- Crystal structure of mitochondrial cytochrome bc complex bound with ubiquinone.

Identifiers
- Symbol: (N/A)
- SCOP2: 1be3 / SCOPe / SUPFAM
- TCDB: 3.D.3
- OPM superfamily: 92
- OPM protein: 3cx5
- Membranome: 258

ubiquinol—cytochrome-c reductase

Identifiers
- EC no.: 7.1.1.8
- CAS no.: 9027-03-6

Databases
- BRENDA: enzyme data
- ExPASy: NiceZyme view
- KEGG: enzyme entry
- MetaCyc: metabolic pathway
- Rhea: reactions
- PDB structures: RCSB PDB PDBe PDBsum
- Gene Ontology: AmiGO / QuickGO
Search
- PMC: articles
- PubMed: articles
- NCBI: proteins

The coenzyme Q : cytochrome c – oxidoreductase, sometimes called the cytochrome bc_{1} complex, and at other times complex III, is the third complex in the electron transport chain (EC 1.10.2.2), playing a critical role in biochemical generation of ATP (oxidative phosphorylation). Complex III is a multisubunit transmembrane protein encoded by both the mitochondrial (cytochrome b) and the nuclear genomes (all other subunits). Complex III is present in the mitochondria of all animals and all aerobic eukaryotes and the inner membranes of most bacteria. Mutations in Complex III cause exercise intolerance as well as multisystem disorders. The bc1 complex contains 11 subunits: 3 respiratory subunits (cytochrome b, cytochrome c_{1}, Rieske protein), 2 core proteins, and 6 low-molecular-weight proteins.

Ubiquinol—cytochrome-c reductase catalyzes the chemical reaction

QH_{2} + 2 ferricytochrome c $\rightleftharpoons$ Q + 2 ferrocytochrome c + 2 H^{+}

Thus, the two substrates of this enzyme are quinol (QH_{2}) and ferri- (Fe^{3+}) cytochrome c, whereas its 3 products are quinone (Q), ferro- (Fe^{2+}) cytochrome c, and H^{+}.

This enzyme belongs to the family of oxidoreductases, specifically those acting on diphenols and related substances as donor with a cytochrome as acceptor. This enzyme participates in oxidative phosphorylation. It has four cofactors: cytochrome c_{1}, cytochrome b-562, cytochrome b-566, and a 2-Iron ferredoxin of the Rieske type.

== Nomenclature ==
The systematic name of this enzyme class is ubiquinol:ferricytochrome-c oxidoreductase. Other names in common use include:

- coenzyme Q-cytochrome c reductase,
- dihydrocoenzyme Q-cytochrome c reductase,
- reduced ubiquinone-cytochrome c reductase, complex III,
- (mitochondrial electron transport),
- ubiquinone-cytochrome c reductase,
- ubiquinol-cytochrome c oxidoreductase,
- reduced coenzyme Q-cytochrome c reductase,
- ubiquinone-cytochrome c oxidoreductase,
- reduced ubiquinone-cytochrome c oxidoreductase,
- mitochondrial electron transport complex III,
- ubiquinol-cytochrome c-2 oxidoreductase,
- ubiquinone-cytochrome b-c1 oxidoreductase,
- ubiquinol-cytochrome c2 reductase,
- ubiquinol-cytochrome c1 oxidoreductase,
- CoQH2-cytochrome c oxidoreductase,
- ubihydroquinol:cytochrome c oxidoreductase,
- coenzyme QH2-cytochrome c reductase, and
- QH2:cytochrome c oxidoreductase.

== Structure ==
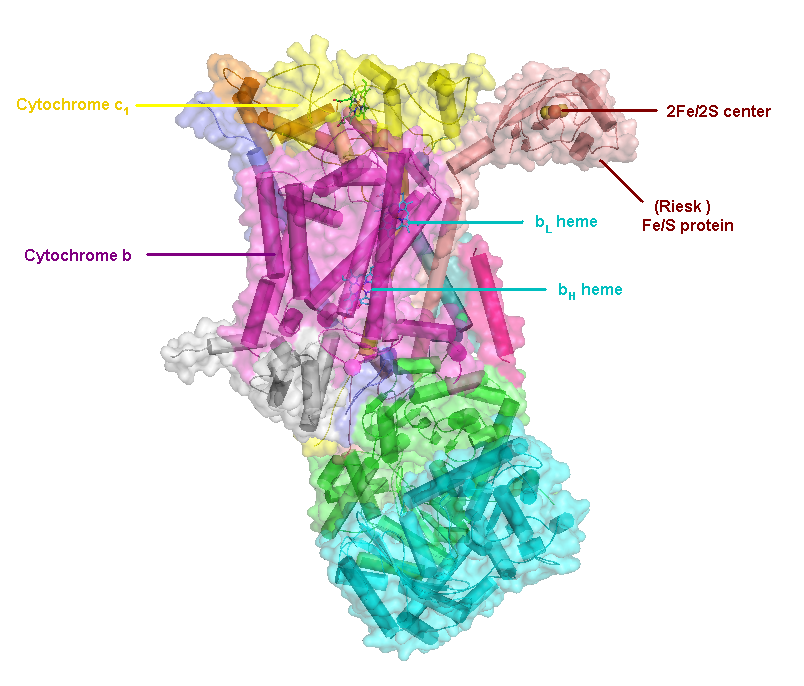
Structure of complex III (click to enlarge)

Compared to the other major proton-pumping subunits of the electron transport chain, the number of subunits found can be small, as small as three polypeptide chains. This number does increase, and eleven subunits are found in higher animals. Three subunits have prosthetic groups. The cytochrome b subunit has two b-type hemes (b_{L} and b_{H}), the cytochrome c subunit has one c-type heme (c_{1}), and the Rieske Iron Sulfur Protein subunit (ISP) has a two iron, two sulfur iron-sulfur cluster (2Fe•2S).

Structures of complex III: PDB: 1KYO, PDB: 1L0L

== Composition of complex ==
In vertebrates the bc_{1} complex, or Complex III, contains 11 subunits: 3 respiratory subunits, 2 core proteins and 6 low-molecular weight proteins. Proteobacterial complexes may contain as few as three subunits.

=== Table of subunit composition of complex III ===
No.	Subunit name	Human gene symbol	Protein description from UniProt	Pfam family with Human protein
Respiratory subunit proteins
1	MT-CYB / Cyt b	MT-CYB	Cytochrome b	Pfam PF13631
2	CYC1 / Cyt c1	CYC1	Cytochrome c1, heme protein, mitochondrial	Pfam PF02167
3	Rieske / UCR1	UQCRFS1	Cytochrome b-c1 complex subunit Rieske, mitochondrial EC 1.10.2.2	Pfam PF02921 , Pfam PF00355
Core protein subunits
4	QCR1 / SU1	UQCRC1	Cytochrome b-c1 complex subunit 1, mitochondrial	Pfam PF00675, Pfam PF05193
5	QCR2 / SU2	UQCRC2	Cytochrome b-c1 complex subunit 2, mitochondrial	Pfam PF00675, Pfam PF05193
Low-molecular weight protein subunits
6	QCR6 / SU6	UQCRH	Cytochrome b-c1 complex subunit 6, mitochondrial	Pfam PF02320
7	QCR7 / SU7	UQCRB	Cytochrome b-c1 complex subunit 7	Pfam PF02271
8	QCR8 / SU8	UQCRQ	Cytochrome b-c1 complex subunit 8	Pfam PF02939
9	QCR9 / SU9	UQCRFS1^{a}	(N-terminal of Rieske, no separate entry)	Pfam PF09165
10	QCR10 / SU10	UQCR10	Cytochrome b-c1 complex subunit 9	Pfam PF05365
11	QCR11 / SU11	UQCR11	Cytochrome b-c1 complex subunit 10	Pfam PF08997

- ^{a} In vertebrates, a cleavage product of 8 kDa from the N-terminus of the Rieske protein (Signal peptide) is retained in the complex as subunit 9. Thus subunits 10 and 11 correspond to fungal QCR9p and QCR10p.

== Reaction ==
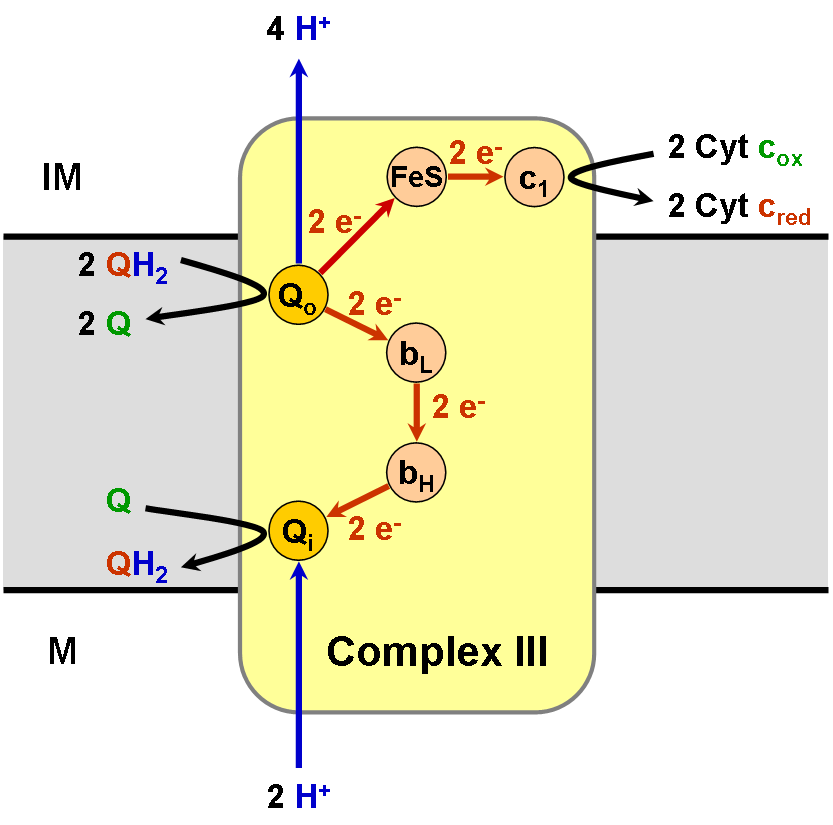
schematic illustration of complex III reactions

It catalyzes the reduction of cytochrome c by oxidation of coenzyme Q (CoQ) and the concomitant pumping of 4 protons from the mitochondrial matrix to the intermembrane space:

QH_{2} + 2 cytochrome c (Fe^{III}) + 2 H^{+}_{in} → Q + 2 cytochrome c (Fe^{II}) + 4 H^{+}_{out}

In the process called Q cycle, two protons are consumed from the matrix (M), four protons are released into the inter membrane space (IM) and two electrons are passed to cytochrome c.

== Reaction mechanism ==
The Q cycle

The reaction mechanism for complex III (cytochrome bc1, coenzyme Q: cytochrome C oxidoreductase) is known as the ubiquinone ("Q") cycle. In this cycle four protons get released into the positive "P" side (inter membrane space), but only two protons get taken up from the negative "N" side (matrix). As a result, a proton gradient is formed across the membrane. In the overall reaction, two ubiquinols are oxidized to ubiquinones and one ubiquinone is reduced to ubiquinol. In the complete mechanism, two electrons are transferred from ubiquinol to ubiquinone, via two cytochrome c intermediates.

Overall:

- 2 x QH_{2} oxidised to Q
- 1 x Q reduced to QH_{2}
- 2 x Cyt c reduced
- 4 x H^{+} released into intermembrane space
- 2 x H^{+} picked up from matrix

The reaction proceeds according to the following steps:

Round 1:

1. Cytochrome b binds a ubiquinol and a ubiquinone.
2. The 2Fe/2S center and B_{L} heme each pull an electron off the bound ubiquinol, releasing two protons into the intermembrane space.
3. One electron is transferred to cytochrome c_{1} from the 2Fe/2S centre, whilst another is transferred from the B_{L} heme to the B_{H} Heme.
4. Cytochrome c_{1} transfers its electron to cytochrome c (not to be confused with cytochrome c1), and the B_{H} Heme transfers its electron to a nearby ubiquinone, resulting in the formation of a ubisemiquinone.
5. Cytochrome c diffuses. The first ubiquinol (now oxidised to ubiquinone) is released, whilst the semiquinone remains bound.

Round 2:

1. A second ubiquinol is bound by cytochrome b.
2. The 2Fe/2S center and B_{L} heme each pull an electron off the bound ubiquinol, releasing two protons into the intermembrane space.
3. One electron is transferred to cytochrome c_{1} from the 2Fe/2S centre, whilst another is transferred from the B_{L} heme to the B_{H} Heme.
4. Cytochrome c_{1} then transfers its electron to cytochrome c, whilst the nearby semiquinone produced from round 1 picks up a second electron from the B_{H} heme, along with two protons from the matrix.
5. The second ubiquinol (now oxidised to ubiquinone), along with the newly formed ubiquinol are released.

== Inhibitors of complex III ==
There are three distinct groups of Complex III inhibitors.

- Antimycin A binds to the Q_{i} site and inhibits the transfer of electrons in Complex III from heme b_{H} to oxidized Q (Qi site inhibitor).
- Myxothiazol and stigmatellin binds to the Q_{o} site and inhibits the transfer of electrons from reduced QH_{2} to the Rieske Iron sulfur protein. Myxothiazol and stigmatellin bind to distinct but overlapping pockets within the Q_{o} site.
  - Myxothiazol binds nearer to cytochrome bL (hence termed a "proximal" inhibitor).
  - Stigmatellin binds farther from heme bL and nearer the Rieske Iron sulfur protein, with which it strongly interacts.

Some have been commercialized as fungicides (the strobilurin derivatives, best known of which is azoxystrobin; QoI inhibitors) and as anti-malaria agents (atovaquone). Some Q_{o} site inhibitors have been commercialized as insecticides (IRAC group 20).

Also propylhexedrine inhibits cytochrome c reductase.

== Oxygen free radicals ==
A small fraction of electrons leave the electron transport chain before reaching complex IV. Premature electron leakage to oxygen results in the formation of superoxide. The relevance of this otherwise minor side reaction is that superoxide and other reactive oxygen species are highly toxic and are thought to play a role in several pathologies, as well as aging (the free radical theory of aging). Electron leakage occurs mainly at the Q_{o} site and is stimulated by antimycin A. Antimycin A locks the b hemes in the reduced state by preventing their re-oxidation at the Q_{i} site, which, in turn, causes the steady-state concentrations of the Q_{o} semiquinone to rise, the latter species reacting with oxygen to form superoxide. The effect of high membrane potential is thought to have a similar effect. Superoxide produced at the Qo site can be released both into the mitochondrial matrix and into the intermembrane space, where it can then reach the cytosol. This could be explained by the fact that Complex III might produce superoxide as membrane permeable HOO^{•} rather than as membrane impermeable O^{−.}_{2}.

== Human gene names ==
- MT-CYB: mtDNA encoded cytochrome b; mutations associated with exercise intolerance
- CYC1: cytochrome c1
- CYCS: cytochrome c
- UQCRFS1: Rieske iron sulfur protein
- UQCRB: Ubiquinone binding protein, mutation linked with mitochondrial complex III deficiency nuclear type 3
- UQCRH: hinge protein
- UQCRC2: Core 2, mutations linked to mitochondrial complex III deficiency, nuclear type 5
- UQCRC1: Core 1
- UQCR: 6.4KD subunit
- UQCR10: 7.2KD subunit
- TTC19: Newly identified subunit, mutations linked to complex III deficiency nuclear type 2. Helps remove the N-terminal fragment of UQCRFS1, which would otherwise interfere with complex III function.

== Mutations in complex III genes in human disease ==
Mutations in complex III-related genes typically manifest as exercise intolerance. Other mutations have been reported to cause septo-optic dysplasia and multisystem disorders. However, mutations in BCS1L, a gene responsible for proper maturation of complex III, can result in Björnstad syndrome and the GRACILE syndrome, which in neonates are lethal conditions that have multisystem and neurologic manifestations typifying severe mitochondrial disorders. The pathogenicity of several mutations has been verified in model systems such as yeast.

The extent to which these various pathologies are due to bioenergetic deficits or overproduction of superoxide is presently unknown.

== See also ==
- Cellular respiration
- Photosynthetic reaction centre

== Additional images ==
ETC
