= Rieske protein =

Protein family with an iron–sulfur center transferring electrons

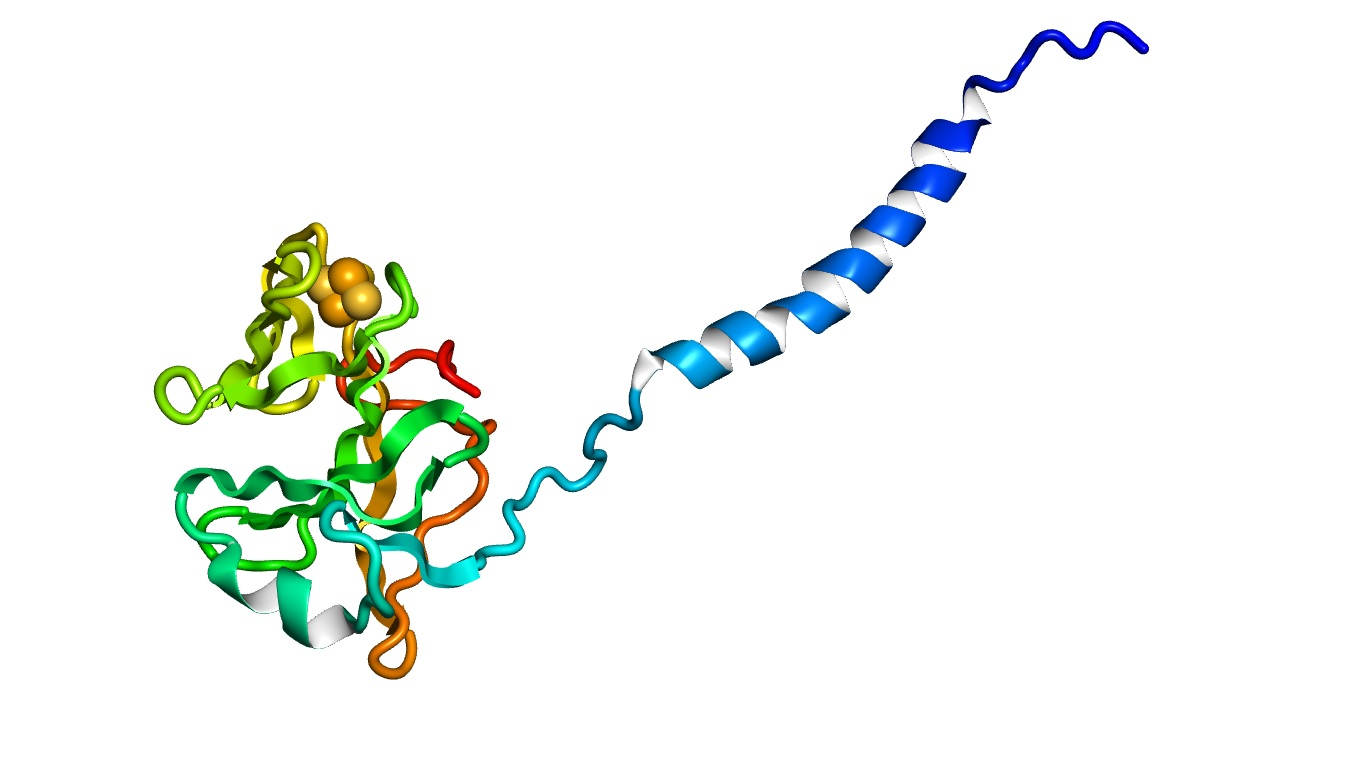
- Rieske protein from cytochrome b6f complex. (PDB: 1vf5)

Identifiers
- Symbol: Rieske
- Pfam: PF00355
- InterPro: IPR005806
- PROSITE: PDOC00177
- SCOP2: 1rie / SCOPe / SUPFAM
- TCDB: 3.E.2
- OPM superfamily: 92
- OPM protein: 1q90
- CDD: cd03467
Available protein structures:
- PDB: IPR005806 PF00355 (ECOD; PDBsum)
- AlphaFold: IPR005806; PF00355

Cytochrome B6-F complex Fe-S subunit, alpha helical transmembrane domain
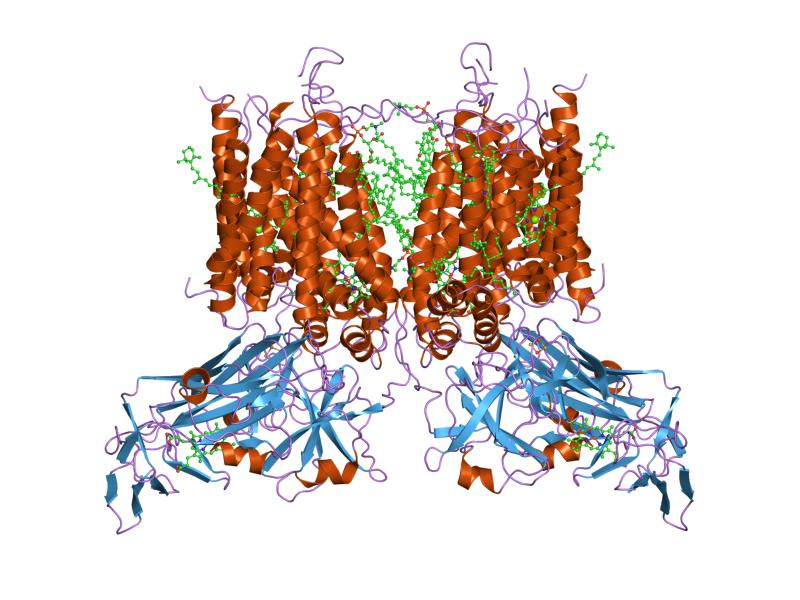
- crystal structure of cytochrome b6f complex from m.laminosus

Identifiers
- Symbol: CytB6-F_Fe-S
- Pfam: PF08802
- InterPro: IPR014909
Available protein structures:
- PDB: IPR014909 PF08802 (ECOD; PDBsum)
- AlphaFold: IPR014909; PF08802

Rieske proteins are iron–sulfur protein (ISP) components of cytochrome bc_{1} complexes and cytochrome b_{6}f complexes and are responsible for electron transfer in some biological systems. John S. Rieske and co-workers first discovered the protein and in 1964 isolated an acetylated form of the bovine mitochondrial protein. In 1979, Trumpower's team isolated the "oxidation factor" from bovine mitochondria and showed it was a reconstitutively-active form of the Rieske iron-sulfur protein.
It is a unique [2Fe-2S] cluster in that one of the two Fe atoms is coordinated by two histidine residues rather than two cysteine residues. They have since been found in plants, animals, and bacteria with widely ranging electron reduction potentials from -150 to +400 mV.

== Biological function ==
Ubiquinol-cytochrome-c reductase (also known as bc1 complex or complex III) is an enzyme complex of bacterial and mitochondrial oxidative phosphorylation systems. It catalyses the oxidation-reduction reaction of the mobile components ubiquinol and cytochrome c, contributing to an electrochemical potential difference across the mitochondrial inner or bacterial membrane, which is linked to ATP synthesis.

The complex consists of three subunits in most bacteria, and nine in mitochondria: both bacterial and mitochondrial complexes contain cytochrome b and cytochrome c1 subunits, and an iron–sulfur 'Rieske' subunit, which contains a high potential 2Fe-2S cluster. The mitochondrial form also includes six other subunits that do not possess redox centres. Plastoquinone-plastocyanin reductase (b6f complex), present in cyanobacteria and the chloroplasts of plants, catalyses the oxidoreduction of plastoquinol and cytochrome f. This complex, which is functionally similar to ubiquinol-cytochrome c reductase, comprises cytochrome b6, cytochrome f and Rieske subunits.

The Rieske subunit acts by binding either a ubiquinol or plastoquinol anion, transferring an electron to the 2Fe-2S cluster, then releasing the electron to the cytochrome c or cytochrome f heme iron. The reduction of the Rieske center increases the affinity of the subunit by several orders of magnitude, stabilizing the semiquinone radical at the Q(P) site. The Rieske domain has a [2Fe-2S] center. Two conserved cysteines coordinate one Fe ion while the other Fe ion is coordinated by two conserved histidines. The 2Fe-2S cluster is bound in the highly conserved C-terminal region of the Rieske subunit.

== Rieske protein family ==
The homologues of the Rieske proteins include ISP components of cytochrome b_{6}f complex, aromatic-ring-hydroxylating dioxygenases (phthalate dioxygenase, benzene, naphthalene and toluene 1,2-dioxygenases) and arsenite oxidase (EC 1.20.98.1). Comparison of amino acid sequences has revealed the following consensus sequence:

Cys-Xaa-His-(Xaa)_{15–18}-Cys-Xaa-Xaa-His

Rieske iron–sulfur center

== 3D structure ==
The overall fold of Rieske proteins, comprising two subdomains, is dominated by antiparallel β-structure and contains variable numbers of α-helices. The smaller "cluster-binding" subdomains in mitochondrial and chloroplast proteins are virtually identical, whereas the large subdomains are substantially different in spite of a common folding topology. The [Fe_{2}S_{2}] cluster-binding subdomains have the topology of an incomplete antiparallel β-barrel. One iron atom of the Rieske [Fe_{2}S_{2}] cluster in the domain is coordinated by two cysteine residues and the other is coordinated by two histidine residues through the N^{δ} atoms. The ligands coordinating the cluster originate from two loops; each loop contributes one Cys and one His.

== Subfamilies ==
- Rieske iron–sulfur protein, C-terminal InterPro: IPR005805
- Arsenite oxidase, small subunit InterPro: IPR014067

== Human proteins containing this domain ==
AIFM3; RFESD; UQCRFS1;
