= Cytochrome b =

Membrane protein involved in the electron transport chain

Cytochrome b, C-terminal domain
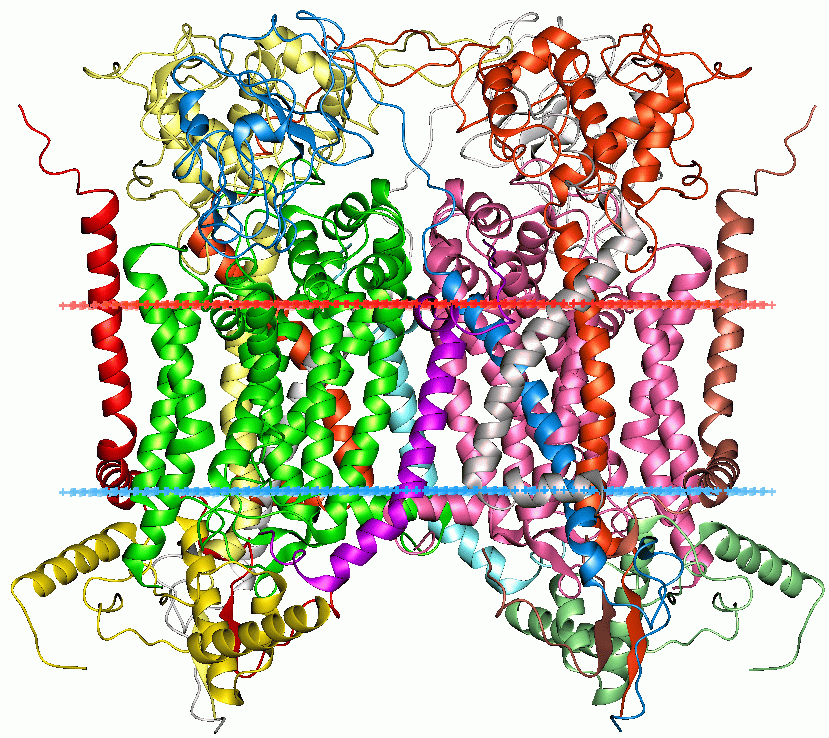
- Mitochondrial cytochrome bc1 complex

Identifiers
- Symbol: Cytochrom_B_C
- Pfam: PF00032
- InterPro: IPR005798
Available protein structures:
- PDB: IPR005798 PF00032 (ECOD; PDBsum)
- AlphaFold: IPR005798; PF00032

Cytochrome b is a protein found in the membranes of aerobic cells that in humans is encoded by the gene MT-CYB. In eukaryotic mitochondria (inner membrane) and in aerobic prokaryotes, cytochrome b is a component of respiratory chain complex III (EC 1.10.2.2)—also known as the bc1 complex or ubiquinol-cytochrome c reductase. In plant chloroplasts and cyanobacteria, there is a homologous protein, cytochrome b6, a component of the plastoquinone-plastocyanin reductase (EC 1.10.99.1), also known as the b6f complex. These complexes are involved in electron transport, the pumping of protons to create a proton-motive force (PMF). This proton gradient is used for the generation of ATP. These complexes play a vital role in cells.

== Structure and function ==
Cytochrome b/b6 is an integral membrane protein of approximately 400 amino acid residues that probably has 8 transmembrane segments. In plants and cyanobacteria, cytochrome b6 consists of two protein subunits encoded by the petB and petD genes. Cytochrome b/b6 non-covalently binds two heme groups, known as b562 and b566. Four conserved histidine residues are postulated to be the ligands of the iron atoms of these two heme groups.

The heme groups are key parts of the internal electron transfer pathway and indispensable to the functioning of the two quinol oxidizing complexes. Two units of b/b6 also form a quinol entry pathway.

== Use in phylogenetics ==
Cytochrome b is commonly used as a region of mitochondrial DNA for determining phylogenetic relationships between organisms, due to its sequence variability. It is considered to be most useful in determining relationships within families and genera. Comparative studies involving cytochrome b have resulted in new classification schemes and have been used to assign newly described species to a genus as well as to deepen the understanding of evolutionary relationships.

== Clinical significance ==
Mutations in cytochrome b primarily result in exercise intolerance in human patients; though more rare, severe multi-system pathologies have also been reported.

Single-point mutations in cytochrome b of Plasmodium falciparum and P. berghei are associated with resistance to the anti-malarial drug atovaquone.

== Fungicide target ==
Cyt b is targeted by the Q_{o}I class of fungicides, Fungicide Resistance Action Committee group 11. The cyt b mutations G143A and F129L provide resistance against the main body of group 11, although G143A does not work against metyltetraprole (11A). G143A is significant in Botrytis cinerea in California strawberry production.
