= Carol Creutz =

American chemist (1944–2013)

- Born: October 20, 1944
- Died: July 10, 2013 (aged 68)
- Education: Stanford University; University of California, Los Angeles
- Known for: Creutz–Taube complex
- Scientific career
- Workplaces: Georgetown University; Brookhaven National Laboratory
- Thesis: Studies of binuclear complexes of ruthenium (II) and (III) (1970)
- Doctoral advisor: Henry Taube

Carol Creutz (October 20, 1944 – July 10, 2013) was an American chemist and Senior Research Scientist at the Brookhaven National Laboratory. She prepared the Creutz–Taube complex, a metal complex that was used to study Inner sphere electron transfer.

== Early life and education ==
Creutz earned her undergraduate degree in chemistry at University of California, Los Angeles. She completed her doctoral degree at Stanford University in 1970. Her research considered the development of binuclear transition metal complexes, and the evaluation of their charge-transfer. These complexes became known as the Creutz–Taube complex. Her supervisor, Henry Taube, was awarded the Nobel prize for electron transfer in 1983.

== Research and career ==
After earning her doctorate Creutz joined Georgetown University as an assistant professor. In 1972 Creutz joined the staff at Brookhaven National Laboratory. She worked alongside Norman Sutin on electro and charge-transfer reactions. Here she was awarded tenure in 1978 and made Chair of Chemistry in 1995. She was the first woman to be a Chair at Brookhaven. She retired in 2012, and was made an emeritus Professor in 2013.

At Brookhaven Creutz investigated electron and ion-transfer reactions. She started focussing on solar conversion and photochemistry. She advanced understanding of redox reactions, which can be used to design more efficient solar fuels.

== Select publications ==
- Carol Creutz; Henry Taube (July 1969). "Direct approach to measuring the Franck-Condon barrier to electron transfer between metal ions". Journal of the American Chemical Society. 91 (14): 3988–3989. doi:10.1021/ja01042a072. ISSN 0002-7863. Wikidata Q56444873.
- Bruce S Brunschwig; Carol Creutz; Norman Sutin (1 May 2002). "Optical transitions of symmetrical mixed-valence systems in the Class II-III transition regime". Chemical Society Reviews. 31 (3): 168–184. doi:10.1039/b008034i. ISSN 0306-0012. PMID 12122642. Wikidata Q60357351.
- Brunschwig, Bruce S.; Creutz, Carol; Macartney, Donal H.; Sham, T-K.; Sutin, Norman (1982). "The role of inner-sphere configuration changes in electron-exchange reactions of metal complexes". Faraday Discussions of the Chemical Society. 74: 113. doi:10.1039/dc9827400113. ISSN 0301-7249.

== Personal life ==
Creutz died on July 10, 2013. Her husband, Michael Cruetz, was a high energy theoretical physicist. She had one daughter.
