= Oxidative coupling of phenols =

Chemical reaction

Oxidative coupling of phenols is a chemical reaction wherein two phenolic compounds are coupled via an oxidative process. Oxidative phenol couplings are often catalyzed by transition metal complexes including V, Cr, Mn, Cu, Fe, among others. Such reactions often form C–C, or C–O bonds between the coupling partners and can be employed as either homo- or cross-couplings.

== Mechanism ==
A representative example is the reaction of phenol with a solution of vanadium tetrachloride, which yields about 60% yield of three isomeric dihydroxybiphenyl compounds. The isomer ratio and yields are unaffected by the reagent/substrate ratio. Vanadium tetrachloride is known to effect one-electron oxidations, which is invoked in this conversion.

Oxidative coupling of phenol by VCl_{4}. Coproducts including vanadium(III) and hydrogen chloride are not shown

Oxidative phenol couplings can occur through either inner sphere or outer sphere processes. In inner sphere processes, the phenolic substrate coordinates to the metal center to give a phenoxide complex. Oxidation to the phenoxide occurs via electron transfer or hydrogen atom abstraction. The resulting reactive intermediate can engage in downstream chemical processes which can occur via either coordinated (inner-sphere) or non-coordinated coupling partners.

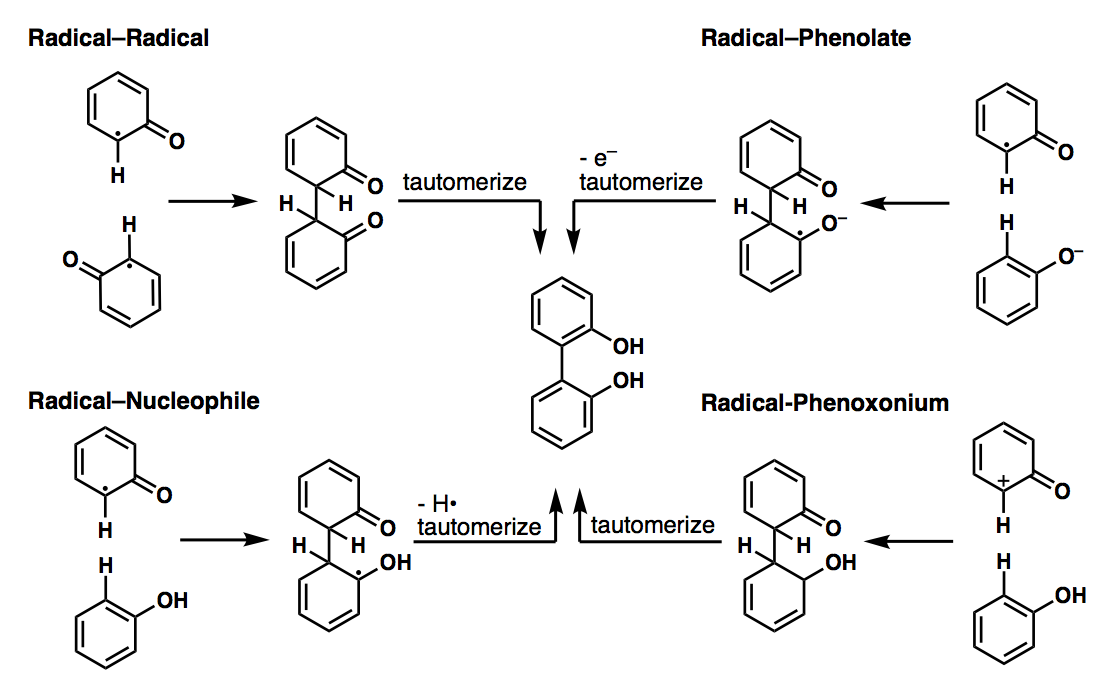
Common Mechanistic Manifolds in Oxidative Phenol Couplings.

Radical-radical reactions are simple to envision but unlikely since it requires the coexistence of two long-lived radicals. Instead, the phenol or phenoxy radical adds to another phenol or phenoxide. The initial C-C bond forming process is followed hydrogen atom abstraction and tautomerization.

Couplings where metal catalysts are not involved generally proceed via the radical-phenol mechanism.

Although select examples of unsymmetrical homocouplings are known, they are notoriously challenging to design and are often arrived at empirically.

Enantioselective asymmetric phenol oxidative couplings are not well-established or general yet, however there exist reports leveraging asymmetric vanadium catalysts to enantioselectively homocouple phenols. In contrast, much progress has been made in asymmetric 2-napthol couplings using Ru, Cu, V, and Fe catalysts, which have had a large impact on the development of BINAP-type ligands used asymmetric catalysis.

== Scope ==
=== Lignin ===
Idealized structure of lignin from a softwood illustrating crosslinking arising from oxidative coupling.

Lignin, a polyphenol that is found in most plants, is a very abundant form of biomass that arises, in part, by oxidative coupling of phenols. Lignins are particularly important in the formation of cell walls, especially in wood and bark, because they lend rigidity and do not rot easily. Chemically, lignins are polymers made by cross-linking phenolic precursors.

=== Organic synthesis ===
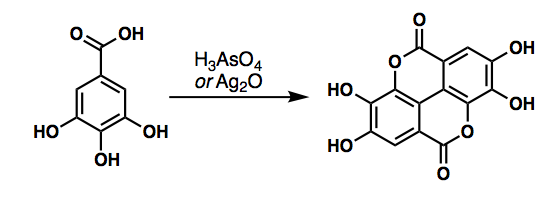
First use of oxidative phenol coupling in the synthesis of ellagic acid from gallic acid.

The first example of an oxidative phenol coupling in synthetic chemistry can be traced to Julius Löwe’s 1868 synthesis of ellagic acid, accomplished by heating gallic acid with arsenic acid.

In the synthesis of complex organic compounds, oxidative phenol couplings are sometimes employed. The reaction is attractive for their atom economy because it avoid pre-functionalized starting materials often required in traditional redox-neutral cross-couplings. Oxidative phenol couplings, however, often suffer from over-oxidation, especially since the intended coupled product is more oxidizable (has a lower oxidation potential) than the starting material. In such cases, the catalyst can be quenched or poisoned by engaging in off-cycle redox processes with the product. Additionally, the product may oxidize further, giving way to higher-order oligomers.

Selectivity issues may arise during oxidative phenol couplings between C–C coupled and C–O coupled products. Moreover, stereoselectivity is an important consideration if the resulting biphenol compound displays axial chirality or atropoisomerism. Selectivity between homo- and hetero-coupled products must be considered, and can often be addressed through transition-metal catalysis.

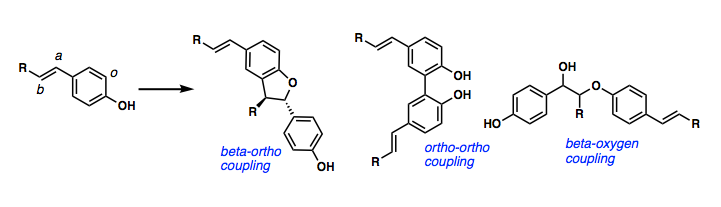
Potential Sites of Reaction in a Phenol Coupling.

==== Intramolecular phenol couplings ====
Intramolecular oxidative phenol couplings have long been known. The most well-studied examples of such transformations are those yielding spirocyclic phenol-dienone coupled products. The coupling partners in an intramolecular coupling must approach in a near-parallel arrangement to allow for orbital overlap; these stringent geometric restraints on pre-cyclized compounds often render the process sluggish, if possible.

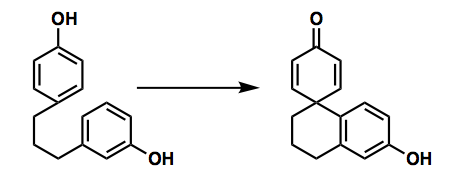
Representative Intramolecular Oxidative Phenol Coupling.

==== C–O couplings ====

Laccases often effect oxidative couplings, sometimes forming C-O linkages.

Selective C–O coupling of phenols are represented by few examples in synthetic chemistry. In many cases, selective C–O coupling can only be achieved if all ortho and para-positions on the arene are blocked. Poor C–O coupling selectivity is likely due to the lack of radical spin-density on oxygen after phenol oxidation, resulting in kinetic trapping of C–C coupling products.

==== Nonphenolic arene couplings ====
Oxidative couplings have also been studied between phenols and nonphenolic compounds including anilines, beta-ketoesters/malonates/malononitriles, electron-rich arenes, olefins, and other functional groups.
