= NMR line broadening techniques =

In chemistry, NMR line broadening techniques (or NMR line broadening experiments) can be used to determine the rate constant and the Gibbs free energy of exchange reactions of two different chemical compounds. If the two species are in equilibrium and exchange to each other, peaks of both species get broadened in the spectrum. This observation of broadened peaks can be used to obtain kinetic and thermodynamic information of the exchange reaction.

== Determining bond rotational energies ==
A basic NMR line broadening experiment is to determine the rotational energy barrier of a certain chemical bond. If the bond rotates slowly enough compared to the NMR time scale (e.g., amide bond), two different species can be detected by the NMR spectrometer. Considering that the time scale of NMR spectroscopy is about a few seconds, this technique can be used to examine the kinetics and/or thermodynamics of chemical exchange reactions on the order of seconds.

In general, the energy barrier to rotate a bond is low enough at room temperature, which means that the rotation is fast, making the two different species indistinguishable. At low temperatures, however, it is harder for a bond to overcome the energy barrier to rotate, resulting in two separate peaks in the spectrum. With these principles, NMR spectra of a molecule with a high rotational barrier should be obtained at several different temperatures (i.e., variable temperature NMR) to distinguish two different peaks at low temperature in slow exchange and to find the temperature at which the two peaks merge.

Especially at the coalescence temperature ($T_c$), where the two peaks coalesce, the rate constant of rotation at $T_c$ and the energy barrier of the rotation can be easily calculated. As increasing the temperature, the exchange reaction get faster, and at a certain temperature, which is $T_c$, the appearance of the peaks changes from two separate peaks in slow exchange to a single peak in fast exchange. The rate constant $k$ at $T_c$ can be calculated with the following equation:

$\ k = \frac{\pi\mid\nu_A - \nu_B\mid}{\sqrt{2}}$,

where $\nu_A$ and $\nu_B$ are the chemical shift of each species at lower temperatures where they are in slow exchange. By using the Eyring equation, the Gibbs free energy of rotation, $\Delta G^\ddagger$, can be determined:

$k = \frac{k_\text{B} T}{h}\mathrm{e}^{-\frac{\Delta G^\Dagger}{RT}}$ (Eyring equation)

$\Delta G^\ddagger = RT_c\ln\frac{k_\text{B} T_c\sqrt{2}}{\pi h\mid \nu_A-\nu_B\mid}$

where $R$ is gas constant, $k_\text{B}$ is the Boltzmann constant, and $h$ is the Planck constant.

== Determining electron transfer self-exchange rates ==
Electron transfer self-exchange rates can be also determined with the experimental value of line-width and chemical shift. Sharp peaks of diamagnetic compounds can be broadened during the electron transfer with its partner paramagnetic compound (one-electron oxidized species), since paramagnetic compounds exhibit broader peaks at a different chemical shift. If their self-exchange rate is sufficiently faster than the NMR timescale, the line-broadening of the peaks is observed at shifted chemical shifts in the spectrum. In order to determine the self-exchange rate of sample compounds, one can choose a certain characteristic peak of the sample diamagnetic compound, and examine the peak broadening in the mixture with its partner paramagnetic compound. The broadened line-widths are proportional to mole fraction, and the equation can be used to determine self-exchange rate with the value of mole fraction, chemical shift and line-width:

$k = \frac{4\pi X_d X_p (\Delta\nu)^2}{ (W -X_pW_p - X_dW_d) C}$,

where $k$ is the rate constant of electron transfer self-exchange, $X_d$ and $X_p$ are the mole fractions of diamagnetic and paramagnetic compounds, $\Delta\nu$ is the chemical shift difference (in Hz) between pure diamagnetic and paramagnetic compounds, and $W$ is the half-width of the peak (width at half height) of the selected peak. $W_d$ and $W_p$are the peak widths of the pure diamagnetic and paramagnetic species, and $\ce{C}$ is the total concentration of the exchanging species in M (mol/L). For more accurate calculation of each mole fraction, the following equations can be used;

$X_p= \frac{ \mid\nu-\nu_d\mid}{\Delta\nu}$

$X_d = 1- X_d$,

where $\nu$ is a shifted chemical shift of the selected peak, and $\nu_d$ is the original chemical shift of the diamagnetic species based on the assumption that the change in chemical shift is linearly correlated to the mole fraction of the paramagnetic species.
