= Creutz–Taube complex =

The Creutz–Taube ion

The Creutz–Taube ion is the metal complex with the formula {[Ru(NH_{3})_{5}]_{2}(C_{4}H_{4}N_{2})}^{5+}. This cationic species has been heavily studied in an effort to understand the intimate details of inner sphere electron transfer, that is, how electrons move from one metal complex to another. The ion is named after Carol Creutz, who first prepared the complex, and her thesis advisor Henry Taube, who received a Nobel Prize in Chemistry for this and related discoveries on electron transfer.

== Properties ==
The complex consists of two pentammineruthenium units linked to the nitrogen atoms in a bridging pyrazine ligand, which completes the octahedral coordination sphere of each metal. The important feature of the compound is that the two metals have apparent fractional oxidation states of +2.5. Normally metal ions, like most ions, have integer oxidation states. For example, ruthenium ammine complexes are typically +2 or +3. The fact that the oxidation states are half-integer indicates that the two Ru(NH_{3})_{5} centers are equivalent in terms of their number of electrons. Crystallographic and theoretical studies are consistent with this description, that is, the two metal centers are equivalent. Characteristic of a mixed-valence complex, this ion strongly absorbs light in the near-infrared part of the electromagnetic spectrum. In the case of the Creutz–Taube ion, the absorption maximum occurs at 1570 nm. This absorption is described as an intervalence charge-transfer band.

== Synthesis ==
The ion was originally isolated as the hydrated tosylate salt [Ru(NH_{3})_{5}]_{2}(C_{4}H_{4}N_{2})(O_{3}SC_{6}H_{4}CH_{3})_{5}·3H_{2}O. It is prepared in two steps via the Ru(III)-Ru(III) pyrazine complex:.

2 [Ru(NH_{3})_{5}Cl]^{2+} + C_{4}H_{4}N_{2} → {[Ru(NH_{3})_{5}]_{2}(C_{4}H_{4}N_{2})}^{6+} + 2 Cl^{−}

2 {[Ru(NH_{3})_{5}]_{2}(C_{4}H_{4}N_{2})}^{6+} + Zn → 2 {Ru(NH_{3})_{5}]_{2}(C_{4}H_{4}N_{2})}^{5+} + Zn^{2+}

The Creutz–Taube ion illustrates the advantages of ruthenium complexes for examining redox reactions. Ru(II) and Ru(III) ions can be interconverted at mild redox potentials. Both of these oxidation states are kinetically inert. Many analogues of this ion have been prepared using different bridging ligands.
