= Hybrid electric double layer =

Hybrid electric double layer (EDL) model and the "two-step" formation process

The hybrid electric double layer (hybrid EDL) is a model that describes the formation of an electric double layer by considering the contribution of electron transfer at a liquid-solid interface, which was first proposed by Wang et al. in 2018. The major difference between the hybrid EDL model and the traditional EDL model is that the hybrid EDL model considers that there are both electrons and ions on the solid surface in the EDL, while the traditional EDL model considers that the solid surface has only adsorbed ions.

The hybrid EDL is also named after Prof. Zhong Lin Wang (Wang model), who proposed it in 2018.

== The two-step formation process ==
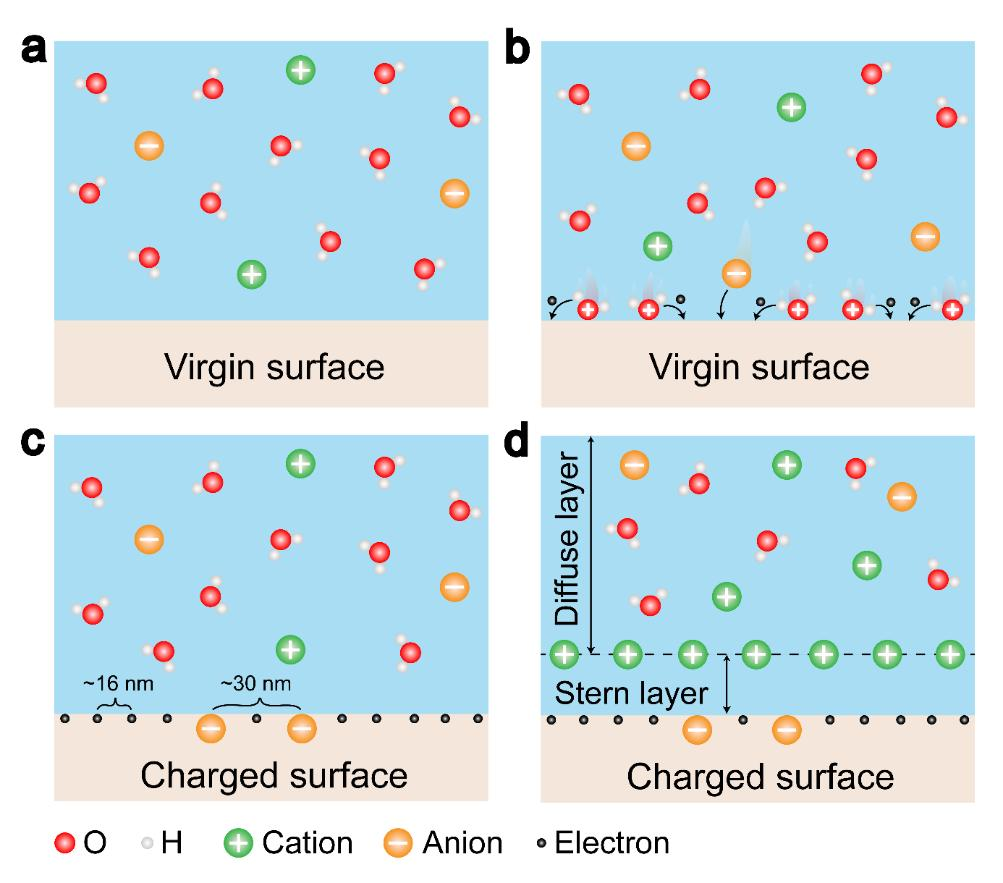
The "two-step" formation process of hybrid electric double layer.

The formation of the hybrid EDL can be described by the two-step process. In the first step, the molecules and ions in the liquid impact the solid surface due to thermal motion and pressure from the liquid, while the overlap of the electron clouds of the solid atoms and water molecules leads to electron transfer between them. Then, due to liquid flow or turbulence, the liquid molecules that are adjacent to the solid surface can be pushed off of the interface.

== Experimental evidence ==
The key difference between the hybrid EDL model and traditional EDL model is whether electron transfer at the liquid-solid interface exists. The electron transfer was verified experimentally at both nano-scale and macro-scale. At nanoscale, it was found that the charges on the solid surface generated by contacting with the liquid can be removed by heating, and the decay of the surface charge density is consistent with the thermionic emission theory, suggesting the existence of electron transfer at the liquid-solid interface. At macroscale, it was noticed that the amount of transferred charge on the solid surface is much greater than the number of ions in the liquid that may by adsorbed to the surface, which also implies that electron transfer plays a dominant role in liquid-solid contact electrification.

== Solid-surface charge density ==
In the hybrid EDL model, the surface charge density (electrons and ions) in the liquid-solid interface is not as dense as that appearing in textbook drawings. For example, the experiments suggest that highest transferred electron density is −0.63 C/m^{2} in the interface between SiO_{2} and deionized water.
