= Mixed-valence complex =

Type of chemical compound

The biferrocenium cation is classified as type II mixed valence complex.

Mixed valence complexes contain an element which is present in more than one oxidation state. Well-known mixed valence compounds include the Creutz–Taube complex, Prussian blue, and molybdenum blue. Many solids are mixed-valency including indium chalcogenides.

== Robin–Day classification ==
The structure of the Creutz-Taube complex.

[Ru_{2}(OAc)_{4}Cl]_{n} is a coordination polymer that is also mixed-valence (Ru(II)Ru(III)).

Mixed-valence compounds are subdivided into three groups, according to the Robin–Day classification:

- Class I, where the valences are trapped—localized on a single site—such as Pb_{3}O_{4} and antimony tetroxide. There are distinct sites with different specific valences in the complex that cannot easily interconvert.
- Class II, which are intermediate in character. There is some localization of distinct valences, but there is a low activation energy for their interconversion. Some thermal activation is required to induce electron transfer from one site to another via the bridge. These species exhibit an intense Intervalence charge transfer (IT or IVCT) band, a broad intense absorption in the infrared or visible part of the spectrum, and also exhibit magnetic exchange coupling at low temperatures. The degree of interaction between the metal sites can be estimated from the absorption profile of the IVCT band and the spacing between the sites. This type of complex is common when metals are in different ligand fields. For example, Prussian blue is an iron(II,III)–cyanide complex in which there is an iron(II) atom surrounded by six carbon atoms of six cyanide ligands bridged to an iron(III) atom by their nitrogen ends. In the Turnbull's blue preparation, an iron(II) solution is mixed with an iron(III) cyanide (c-linked) complex. An electron-transfer reaction occurs via the cyanide ligands to give iron(III) associated with an iron(II)-cyanide complex.
- Class III, wherein mixed valence is not distinguishable by spectroscopic methods as the valence is completely delocalized. The Creutz–Taube complex is an example of this class of complexes. These species also exhibit an IT band. Each site exhibits an intermediate oxidation state, which can be half-integer in value. This class is possible when the ligand environment is similar or identical for each of the two metal sites in the complex. In fact, Robson type dianionic tetraimino-diphenolate ligands which provide equivalent N2O2 environments for two metal centres have stabilized the mixed valence diiron complexes of class III. The bridging ligand needs to be very good at electron transfer, be highly conjugated, and be easily reduced.

=== Creutz–Taube ion ===
The Creutz–Taube complex is a robust, readily analyzed, mixed-valence complex consisting of otherwise equivalent Ru(II) and Ru(III) centers bridged by the pyrazine. This complex serves as a model for the bridged intermediate invoked in inner-sphere electron transfer.

== Mixed valence organic compounds ==
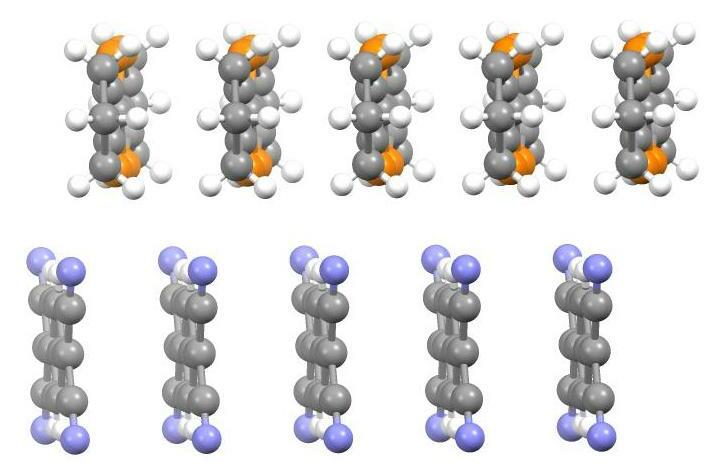
Edge-on view of the crystal structure of hexamethyleneTTF/TCNQ charge transfer salt, which features mixed valency.

Organic mixed valence compounds are also known. Mixed valency in fact seems to be required for organic compounds to exhibit electrical conductivity.
