= Biflaviolin synthase =

Class of enzymes

Identifiers
- EC no.: 1.14.19.69

Databases
- IntEnz: IntEnz view
- BRENDA: BRENDA entry
- ExPASy: NiceZyme view
- KEGG: KEGG entry
- MetaCyc: metabolic pathway
- PRIAM: profile
- PDB structures: RCSB PDB PDBe PDBsum
Search
- PMC: articles
- PubMed: articles
- NCBI: proteins

Biflaviolin synthase (EC 1.14.19.69, CYP158A2, CYP 158A2, cytochrome P450 158A2) is an enzyme with systematic name flaviolin,NADPH:oxygen oxidoreductase. This enzyme catalyses two related chemical reactions:

2
flaviolin
+ 2 reduced
ferredoxin + 2 H^{+}
O_{2}
2 H_{2}O
3,3'-biflaviolin
+ 2 oxidised
ferredoxin

The reaction is an oxidative coupling of phenols which forms a dimer of the starting material. The alternative isomer, 3,8'-biflaviolin, is also producted. Biflaviolin synthase is a cytochrome P450 enzyme, isolated from the soil-dwelling bacterium Streptomyces coelicolor.
