= IT band =

IT band may refer to:

- Intervalence charge transfer
- Iliotibial tract
