= Bray–Liebhafsky reaction =

Chemical clock involving hydrogen peroxide and iodine

The Bray–Liebhafsky reaction is a chemical clock first described by William C. Bray in 1921 and the first oscillating reaction in a stirred homogeneous solution. He investigated the role of the iodate (IO^{−}_{3}), the anion of iodic acid, in the catalytic conversion of hydrogen peroxide to oxygen and water by the iodate. He observed that the concentration of iodine molecules oscillated periodically and that hydrogen peroxide was consumed during the reaction.

An increase in temperature reduces the cycle in the range of hours. This oscillating reaction consisting of free radical on non-radical steps was investigated further by his student Herman A. Liebhafsky, hence the name Bray–Liebhafsky reaction. During this period, most chemists rejected the phenomenon and tried to explain the oscillation by invoking heterogeneous impurities.

A fundamental property of this system is that hydrogen peroxide has a redox potential which enables the simultaneous oxidation of iodine to iodate:

5 H_{2}O_{2} + I_{2} → 2 IO^{−}_{3} + 2 H^{+} + 4 H_{2}O

and the reduction of iodate back to iodine:

5 H_{2}O_{2} + 2 IO^{−}_{3} + 2 H^{+} → I_{2} + 5 O_{2} + 6 H_{2}O

Between these two reactions the system oscillates causing a concentration jump of the iodate and iodine and thus differing oxygen production. The net reaction is:

2 H_{2}O_{2} → 2 H_{2}O + O_{2}

necessitating a catalyst and IO^{−}_{3}.

== See also ==
- Chemical oscillator
