= Rudolph A. Marcus =

Canadian-born American chemist and Nobel laureate (1923–2026)

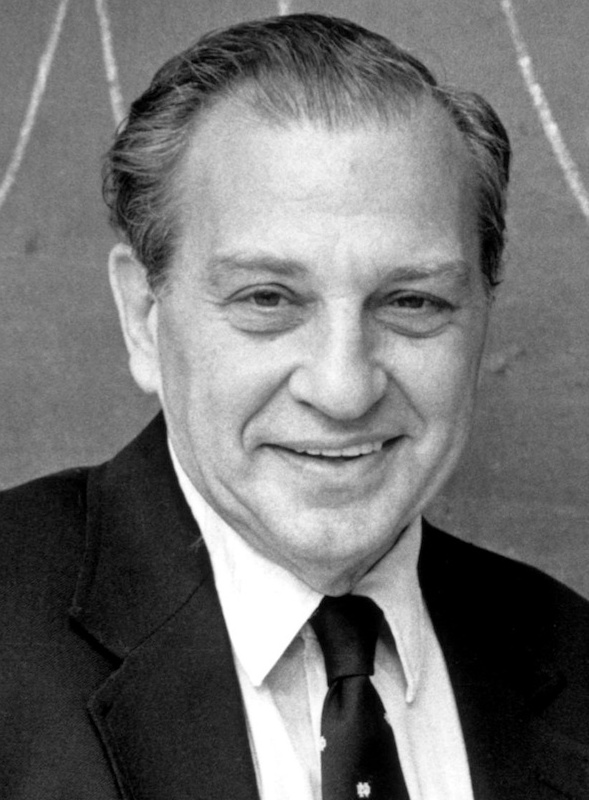
- Born: Rudolph Arthur Marcus; July 21, 1923; Montreal, Quebec, Canada
- Died: July 16, 2026 (aged 102); Pasadena, California, U.S.
- Education: McGill University (BSc, PhD)
- Known for: Marcus theory RRKM theory
- Spouse: Laura Hearne (m. 1949; died 2003)
- Children: 3
- Awards: Irving Langmuir Award (1978); Wolf Prize in Chemistry (1985); Centenary Prize (1988/89); Peter Debye Award (1988); National Medal of Science (1989); Linus Pauling Award (1991); Nobel Prize in Chemistry (1992); Oesper Award (1997)
- Scientific career
- Fields: Chemistry
- Workplaces: New York University Tandon School of Engineering; University of Illinois at Urbana-Champaign; California Institute of Technology
- Thesis: Studies on the conversion of PHX to AcAn (1946)
- Doctoral advisor: Carl A. Winkler
- Doctoral students: Gregory A. Voth
- Other notable students: Ramakrishna Ramaswamy (postdoc)
- Website: "Caltech Division of Chemistry: Rudolph A. Marcus". Archived from the original on January 15, 2018. (archived)

Rudolph Arthur Marcus (July 21, 1923 – July 16, 2026) was a Canadian-born American chemist who received the 1992 Nobel Prize in Chemistry "for his contributions to the theory of electron transfer reactions in chemical systems". Marcus theory, named after him, provides a thermodynamic and kinetic framework for describing one electron outer-sphere electron transfer. He was a professor at Caltech, Nanyang Technological University, Singapore and a member of the International Academy of Quantum Molecular Science.

== Education and early life ==
Rudolph Arthur Marcus was born in Montreal, Quebec, on July 21, 1923, the son of Esther (born Cohen) and Myer Marcus. His father was born in New York and his mother was born in England. His family originated in Ukmergė, Lithuania, then part of Russia. He was Jewish and grew up mostly in a Jewish neighbourhood in Montreal but also spent some of his childhood in Detroit, United States. His interest in the sciences began at a young age. He excelled at mathematics at Baron Byng High School. He then studied at McGill University under Carl A. Winkler, who had studied under Cyril Hinshelwood at the University of Oxford. At McGill, Marcus took more math courses than an average chemistry student, which would later aid him in creating his theory on electron transfer.

Marcus earned a B.Sc. in 1943 and a Ph.D. in 1946, both from McGill University. In 1958, he became a naturalized citizen of the United States.

== Career and research ==
After graduating, in 1946, he took postdoctoral positions first at the National Research Council (Canada), followed by the University of North Carolina. He received his first faculty appointment at the Polytechnic Institute of Brooklyn. In 1952, at the University of North Carolina, he developed Rice–Ramsperger–Kassel–Marcus (RRKM) theory by combining the former RRK theory with the transition state theory. In 1964, he taught at the University of Illinois. Marcus moved to the California Institute of Technology in 1978. His approach to solving a problem was to "go full tilt" – he said echoing his interviewer in Veery Journal – pursuing the problem until he either reached an answer or decided it was time to put the problem aside for a while.

=== Marcus theory of electron transfer ===
Electron transfer is one of the simplest forms of a chemical reaction. It consists of one outer-sphere electron transfer between substances of the same atomic structure likewise to Marcus's studies between divalent and trivalent iron ions. Electron transfer may be one of the most basic forms of chemical reaction but without it life cannot exist. Electron transfer is used in all respiratory functions as well as photosynthesis. In the process of oxidizing food molecules, two hydrogen ions, two electrons, and half an oxygen molecule react to make an exothermic reaction as well as a water molecule:

2 H^{+} + 2 e^{−} + ½ O_{2} → H_{2}O + heat

Because electron transfer is such a broad, common, and essential reaction within nature, Marcus's theory has become vital within the field of chemistry and biochemistry.

A type of chemical reaction linked to his many studies of electron transfer would be the transfer of an electron between metal ions in different states of oxidation. An example of this type of chemical reaction would be one between a divalent and a trivalent iron ion in an aqueous solution. In Marcus's time chemists were astonished at the slow rate in which this specific reaction took place. This attracted many chemists in the 1950s and is also what began Marcus's interests in electron transfer. Marcus made many studies based on the principles that were found within this chemical reaction, and through his studies was able to elaborate his electron transfer theory. His approach gave way to new experimental programs that contributed to all branches within chemistry and biochemistry.

== Later life and death ==
As of his 100th birthday, he was still actively conducting research. He died at his home in Pasadena, California, on July 16, 2026, five days shy of his 103rd birthday.

== Honours and awards ==
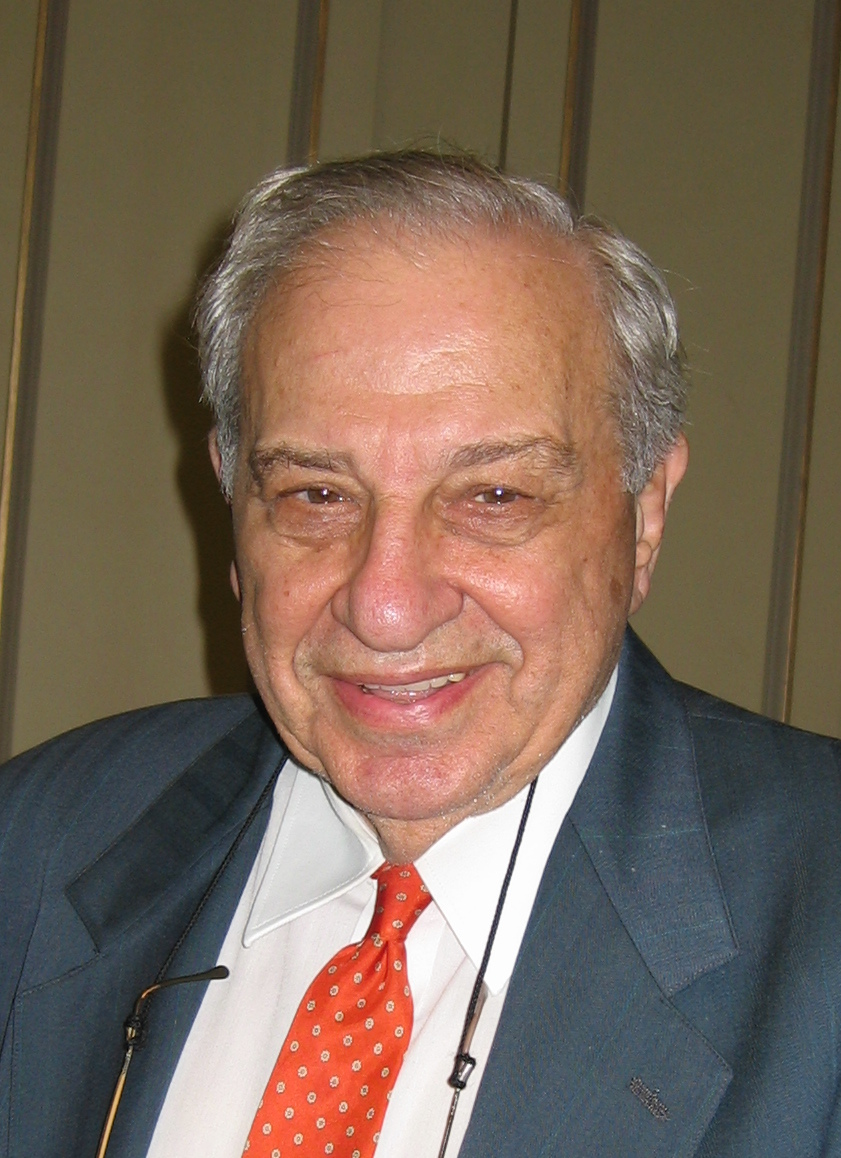
Marcus in 2005

Marcus was awarded honorary degrees from the University of Chicago in 1983, the University of Gothenburg in 1987, the Polytechnic Institute of Brooklyn in 1987, McGill University in 1988, Queen's University in 1993, the University of New Brunswick in 1993, the University of Oxford in 1995, the University of North Carolina at Chapel Hill in 1996, the Yokohama National University in 1996, the University of Illinois at Urbana–Champaign in 1997, the Technion – Israel Institute of Technology in 1998, the Technical University of Valencia in 1999, Northwestern University in 2000, the University of Waterloo in 2002, the Nanyang Technological University in 2010, the Tumkur University in 2012, the University of Hyderabad in 2012, and the University of Calgary in 2013. In addition, he was awarded an honorary doctorate from the University of Santiago, Chile, in 2018.

In addition to the Nobel Prize in Chemistry in 1992, Marcus received the Irving Langmuir Prize in Chemical Physics in 1978, the Robinson Medal of the Faraday Division of the Royal Society of Chemistry in 1982, Columbia University's Chandler Medal in 1983, the Wolf Prize in Chemistry in 1985, the Centenary Prize for 1988-1989, the Willard Gibbs Award and the Peter Debye Award in 1988, the National Medal of Science in 1989, Ohio State's William Lloyd Evans Award in 1990, the Theodore William Richards Medal Award (NESACS) in 1990, the Pauling Medal and the Remsen Award in 1991, the Golden Plate Award of the American Academy of Achievement in 1993 and the Hirschfelder Prize in Theoretical Chemistry for 1992-1993.

Marcus also received a professorial fellowship at University College, Oxford, from 1975 to 1976.

Marcus was elected to the National Academy of Sciences in 1970, the American Academy of Arts and Sciences in 1973, the American Philosophical Society in 1990, received honorary membership in the Royal Society of Chemistry in 1991, and in the Royal Society of Canada in 1993. He was elected a Foreign Member of the Royal Society (ForMemRS) in 1987.

In 2019, Marcus was awarded the Fray International Sustainability award at SIPS 2019 by FLOGEN Star Outreach.

== See also ==
- Henry Taube, who was awarded the 1983 Nobel Prize in Chemistry for "his work on the mechanisms of electron-transfer reactions, especially in metal complexes"
- List of Jewish Nobel laureates
