= Michael Creutz =

American physicist (born 1944)

Michael John Creutz (born November 24, 1944) is an American theoretical physicist at Brookhaven National Laboratory specializing in lattice gauge theory and computational physics.

== Background ==
Creutz was born in 1944 in Los Alamos, New Mexico. His father, Edward Creutz, was also a physicist and was working on the Manhattan Project to help build the atomic bomb at the time of Michael's birth.

Creutz graduated with honor with a bachelor's degree in physics from Caltech in 1966. afterward, he married chemist Carol Creutz. He did his graduate work at Stanford University under a NSF Graduate Fellowship, graduating in 1970. His thesis was done at the Stanford Linear Accelerator Center and his adviser was the noted physicist Sidney Drell.

After his graduation he served shortly as a research associate at SLAC before moving to the Center for Theoretical Physics at the University of Maryland, College Park, where he was a fellow from 1970-1972. In 1972 he joined the High Energy Theory Group at Brookhaven National Laboratory, becoming a senior physicist in 1985 and serving as group leader from 1984 to 1987. In 2003 he became an adjunct professor at the C. N. Yang Institute for Theoretical Physics at nearby Stony Brook University.

== Research ==
Creutz's research spans a wide variety of topics in particle physics and mathematical physics, but he is best known for his work on lattice QCD. His 1983 textbook Quarks, Gluons, and Lattices was the first full-length textbook on lattice QCD and is considered a classic in the field.

Creutz is a fellow of the American Physical Society and was the 2000 recipient of the Aneesur Rahman Prize for Computational Physics "for first demonstrating that properties of QCD could be computed numerically on the lattice through Monte Carlo methods, and for numerous contributions to the field thereafter." In 2009 he received a Humboldt Research Award.

== Books ==
- Creutz, Michael (1983). Quarks, gluons, and lattices. Cambridge [Cambridgeshire]: Cambridge University Press. ISBN 0-521-24405-6. OCLC 9323498.
- Berg, B. (1988). Lattice Higgs Workshop : Florida State University, May 16-18, 1988. Singapore: World Scientific. ISBN 9971-5-0686-6. OCLC 19290040.
- Creutz, Michael (1992). "Quantum Fields on the Computer". Advanced Series on Directions in High Energy Physics. Vol. 11. WORLD SCIENTIFIC. doi:10.1142/1634. ISBN 978-981-02-0939-1. ISSN 1793-1339.
