= Henry Taube =

Canadian-born American chemist (1915–2005)

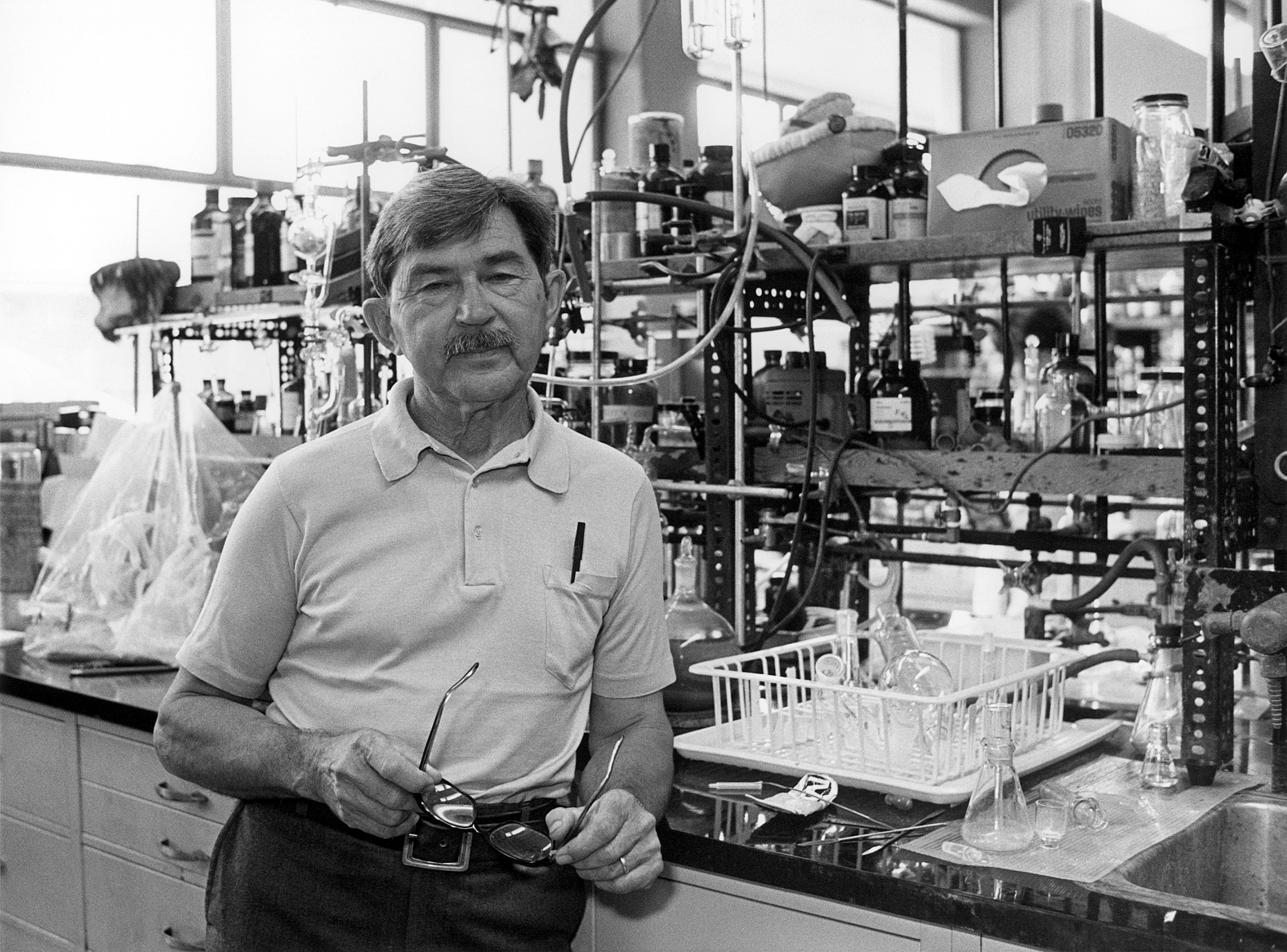
- Born: November 30, 1915; Neudorf, Saskatchewan, Canada
- Died: November 16, 2005 (aged 89); Palo Alto, California, U.S.
- Education: University of Saskatchewan (BSc, 1935; MSc, 1937); University of California, Berkeley (PhD) (1940)
- Known for: Inner sphere electron transfer
- Awards: William H. Nichols Medal (1971); National Medal of Science (1976); Welch Award in Chemistry (1983); Nobel Prize in Chemistry (1983); NAS Award in Chemical Sciences (1983); Priestley Medal (1985)
- Scientific career
- Fields: Chemistry
- Workplaces: Cornell University, University of Chicago, Stanford University
- Thesis: The interaction of ozone and hydrogen peroxide (1940)
- Doctoral advisor: William Crowell Bray
- Doctoral students: Harold Friedman; Robert A. Plane; Maynard Olson
- Other notable students: Richard Robson

Henry Taube FRSC (November 30, 1915 – November 16, 2005) was a Canadian-born American chemist who was awarded the 1983 Nobel Prize in Chemistry for "his work in the mechanisms of electron-transfer reactions, especially in metal complexes." He was the second Canadian-born chemist to win the Nobel Prize, and remains the only Saskatchewanian-born Nobel laureate. Taube completed his undergraduate and master's degrees at the University of Saskatchewan, and his PhD from the University of California, Berkeley. After finishing graduate school, Taube worked at Cornell University, the University of Chicago and Stanford University.

In addition to the Nobel Prize, Taube also received many other major scientific awards, including the Priestley Medal in 1985 and two Guggenheim Fellowships early in his career (1949 and 1955), as well as numerous honorary doctorates. His research focused on redox reactions, transition metals and the use of isotopically labeled compounds to follow reactions. He had over 600 publications including one book, and had mentored over 200 students during his career. Taube and his wife Mary had three children; his son Karl is an anthropologist at the University of California Riverside.

== Education ==
At 12, Taube left his hometown and moved to Regina to attend Luther College where he completed high school. After graduating, Taube stayed at Luther College and worked as laboratory assistant for Paul Liefeld, allowing him to take first year university classes. Taube attended the University of Saskatchewan, receiving his BSc in 1935 and his MSc in 1937. His thesis advisor at the University of Saskatchewan was John Spinks. While at the University of Saskatchewan, Taube studied with Gerhard Herzberg, who would be awarded the 1971 Nobel Prize in Chemistry. He moved to University of California, Berkeley, where he completed his PhD studies in 1940. His PhD mentor was William C. Bray. Taube's graduate research focused on the photodecomposition of chlorine dioxide and hydrogen peroxide in solution.

== Research and academic career ==
=== Academic posts ===
After completing his education, Taube remained in the United States, becoming an instructor in chemistry at Berkeley until 1941. He initially wanted to return to Canada to work, but did not receive a response when he applied for jobs at the major Canadian universities. From Berkeley, he served as an instructor and assistant professor at Cornell University until 1946. During World War II, Taube served on the National Defense Research Committee. Taube spent time at the University of Chicago as an assistant professor, associate professor and as a full professor from 1946 to 1961. He served as chair of the chemistry department in Chicago from 1956 to 1959, but did not enjoy administrative work. After leaving Chicago, Taube worked as a professor at Stanford University until 1986, a position that allowed him to focus on research, while also teaching classes at the undergraduate and graduate levels. He became a Professor Emeritus at Stanford in 1986, but he continued to perform research until 2001, and visited his labs every day until his death in 2005. In addition to his academic duties, Taube also served as a consultant at Los Alamos National Laboratory from 1956 until the 1970s.

=== Research interests ===
Taube's initial research at Cornell University focused on the same areas he studied as a graduate student, oxidizing agents containing oxygen and halogens, and redox reactions featuring these species. He used isotopically labeled oxygen-18 and radioactive chlorine to study these reactions. He was recognized by the American Chemical Society in 1955 for his isotope studies.

Taube's interest in coordination chemistry was sparked when he was chosen to develop a course on advanced inorganic chemistry while at the University of Chicago. He was unable to find much information in the textbooks available at the time. Taube realized that his work on the substitution of carbon in organic reactions could be related to inorganic complexes. In 1952, Taube published a key paper relating the rates of chemical reactions to electronic structure in Chemical Reviews. This research was the first to recognize the correlation between the rate of ligand substitution and the d-electron configuration of the metal. Taube's key discovery was the way molecules build a type of "chemical bridge" rather than simply exchanging electrons, as previously thought. Identifying this intermediate step explained why reactions between similar metals and ions occurred at different rates. His paper in Chemical Reviews was developed while on sabbatical in the late 1940s. An article in Science called this paper "one of the true classics in inorganic chemistry" after his Nobel Prize was announced. Taube researched ruthenium and osmium, both elements have a high capacity for back bonding. This type of electron donation was key when studying the way electrons are transferred between molecules in a chemical reaction.

When looking back on his research, Taube explained that he sometimes had difficulty finding graduate students willing to work on electron transfer reactions, as they preferred to work on more "exciting" projects in his laboratory focusing on the effects of isotopic tracers and kinetics. Taube felt that a "primary flaw" with his correlation between electron configuration and ligand substitution was that it was described mainly in terms of valence bond theory, as crystal field theory and ligand field theory were not well established when he published his work in 1952.

=== Awards and honours ===
==== Nobel Prize ====
Taube was awarded the 1983 Nobel Prize in Chemistry "for his work on the mechanisms of electron transfer reactions, especially in metal complexes." He received his award on December 8, 1983, with the presentation speech being delivered by Ingvar Lindqvist of the Swedish Royal Academy of Sciences. Taube's Nobel Lecture was entitled "Electron Transfer between Metal Complexes – Retrospective." His Nobel Prize was the second awarded to a Canadian-born chemist (the first one was William Giauque). His initial paper in Chemical Reviews was 30 years old at the time of his Nobel Prize victory, but the correlation he described between the rate of ligand substitution and electronic configuration for transition metal coordination complexes was still the predominant theory about the reaction chemistry of these compounds. After being awarded the Nobel Prize, Taube noticed a side benefit to the prestigious award – his students paid better attention in class.

==== Other awards ====
Taube was accepted as a member of the National Academy of Sciences in 1959. In 1961, he was elected to the American Academy of Arts and Sciences. President Jimmy Carter presented Taube with the 1976 President's National Medal of Science "in recognition of contributions to the understanding of reactivity and reaction mechanisms in inorganic chemistry." He was elected to the American Philosophical Society in 1981. In 1985, Taube received the American Chemical Society's highest honour, the Priestley Medal, which is awarded to recognize "distinguished services to chemistry". He was awarded Guggenheim Fellowships in 1949 and 1955. In 1965, he received the Golden Plate Award of the American Academy of Achievement. Taube was made an honorary member of the College of Chemists of Catalonia and Beleares (1984), the Canadian Society of Chemists (1986), and the Hungarian Academy of Sciences (1988). He was also awarded an honorary fellowship in the Royal Society of Chemistry (1989) and the Indian Chemical Society (1989) and elected a Fellow of the Royal Society (FRS) in 1988. Taube received honorary degrees from many institutions, including the University of Saskatchewan (1973), the University of Chicago (1983), the Polytechnic Institute of New York (1984), the State University of New York Stony Brook (1985), the University of Guelph (1987), Seton Hall University (1988), the Lajos Kossuth University of Debrecen in Hungary (1988) and Northwestern University (1990). A Nobel Laureate Plaza on the University of Saskatchewan's campus in honor of Taube and Gerhard Herzberg was dedicated in 1997.

==== Legacy ====
In 1981, Taube became a founding member of the World Cultural Council. As of 1997, Taube had over 600 publications, and had worked with over 250 students. He published a book, Electron Transfer Reactions of Complex Ions in Solution (Current Chemical Concepts) in 1970. His students have had faculty positions at many prestigious universities, including Cornell, Rutgers, Georgetown and Georgia Tech. Together with graduate student Carol Creutz, he is the namesake of the Creutz-Taube complex, a metal complex with the formula [Ru(NH_{3})_{5}]_{2}(C_{4}H_{4}N_{2})^{5+}. His research contributions have been honored in several ways, including a symposium at the 1982 annual American Chemical Society meeting. The annual series Progress in Inorganic Chemistry dedicated its 30th volume to Taube, entitled "An Appreciation of Henry Taube." Luther College in Regina, Saskatchewan offers an annual scholarship to an entering science student in honor of Taube and his science teacher, Paul Liefeld. A seminar series was created in honor of his work at Stanford. Taube gave the inaugural lecture in the series.

Colleagues remember Taube as a dedicated scientist, Jim Collman of Stanford said "Henry was a scientist's scientist and a dominant figure in the field of inorganic chemistry." Harry Gray, a professor at California Institute of Technology said, "He was in a class by himself, a role model and leader whom we all admired and loved." Former student Peter Ford remembers that Taube "made chemistry not only challenging and stimulating, but a lot of fun as well."

== Personal life ==
Taube was born November 30, 1915, in Neudorf, Saskatchewan, as the youngest of four boys. His parents were ethnic Germans from Ukraine who had immigrated to Saskatchewan from Ukraine in 1911. Growing up, his first language was Low German. In the 18th century, Catherine the Great encouraged Central European farmers to settle in Russia. As the rights afforded to these settlers by Catherine were gradually diminished, many of the settlers headed to North America, with Saskatchewan offering good farmland, and other incentives for immigrants. Taube reflected fondly on his experiences growing up in Saskatchewan, noting: "Certainly, there is nothing about my first 21 years in Saskatchewan, taken in the context of those times that I would wish to be changed. The advantages that I enjoyed include: the marvelous experience of growing up on a farm, which taught me an appreciation of nature, and taught me also to discipline myself to get necessary jobs done..."

After completing his graduate studies, Taube became a naturalized citizen of the United States in 1942. Taube married his wife Mary in 1952. They had three children, Karl, Heinrich, and Linda. His stepdaughter Marianna died of cancer in 1998. When he stopped his active research projects in 2001, Taube continued to be available as a reviewer and consultant, but his main goal was "enjoying life". Away from chemistry, Taube had varied interests including gardening and classical music, mainly opera. In 2003 he was one of 22 Nobel laureates who signed the Humanist Manifesto.

Taube died at his home in Palo Alto, California on November 16, 2005, at the age of 89.

== See also ==
- Rudolph A. Marcus, who was awarded the 1992 Nobel Prize in Chemistry for his contribution to the RRKM theory on electron transfer

== Publications ==
- Taube, H., Jackson, J. A. & J. F. Lemons. "Oxygen-17 NMR Shifts Caused by Cr^{2+} in Aqueous Solutions", Los Alamos Scientific Laboratory, United States Department of Energy (through predecessor agency the Atomic Energy Commission), (1962).
- Taube, H. "Reactions of Solvated Ions Final Report", University of Chicago, United States Department of Energy (through predecessor agency the Atomic Energy Commission), (September 24, 1962).
- Taube, H. & A. Viste. "Isotopic Discrimination of Some Solutes in Liquid Ammonia", University of Chicago, Stanford University, United States Department of Energy (through predecessor agency the Atomic Energy Commission), (1966).
- Taube, H. "Final Technical Report of Research", Stanford University, United States Department of Energy (through predecessor agency the Atomic Energy Commission), (April 3, 1972).
