= William C. Bray =

Canadian-American chemist (1879–1946)

William Crowell Bray
- Born: 2 September 1879; Wingham, Ontario, Canada
- Died: 24 February 1946 (aged 66)
- Resting place: Chapel of Memories Columbarium and Mausoleum in Oakland, CA
- Citizenship: American
- Education: University of Toronto
- Known for: Mechanisms of inorganic oxidation-reduction reactions; Profound influence on teaching of inorganic chemistry
- Spouse: Nora Thomas
- Children: 1
- Scientific career
- Workplaces: Leipzig University; University of California, Berkeley; MIT; Fixed Nitrogen Research Laboratory
- Doctoral advisors: Wilhelm Ostwald; Robert Luther

William Crowell Bray (2 September 1879 – 24 February 1946) was an American chemist, born in Canada, best known for his work on the mechanisms of inorganic oxidation-reduction reactions in aqueous solutions. He also “had a profound influence upon the teaching of inorganic chemistry in the University of California, from the freshman to the graduate years.

== Biography ==
William Crowell Bray was born 2 September 1879 in Wingham, Ontario, Canada, the son of William Thomas Bray and Ethel Kathleen Willson. His father died when he was three, and his mother nine years later. Bray graduated from the Collegiate Institute of London, Ontario, and attended the University of Toronto. He graduated in chemistry with honours in 1902 and was awarded a travelling fellowship. Bray spent three years in Leipzig in the school of Wilhelm Ostwald where, under the direction of Professor Robert Luther, he studied for his PhD, which was awarded in 1905. That same year he was invited to join the group of A. A. Noyes at MIT; he stayed there for seven years during which time he published 11 papers. Four of these were particularly notable and concerned A System of Qualitative Analysis for the Rare Elements, later the subject of a book with Noyes.

Bray was naturalized in Boston on 5 June 1911. The following year he moved across the country to join Gilbert N. Lewis’s group at the University of California, Berkeley. Joel Henry Hildebrand wrote in his memoir of Bray that:

Here, in addition to continuing his research activity, he played a prominent part in developing the methods in both undergraduate and graduate instruction which have had wide influence throughout the United States. It was the conviction of Lewis, eagerly adopted by his young colleagues, that research and teaching should be regarded as allies, not enemies, that one must begin right in the freshman course in order to develop graduate students eager and able in research.

During World War I there were many victims of carbon monoxide poisoning in sites of incomplete combustion, such as battleship turrets, and so there was an urgent need to develop gas masks. Bray and several colleagues, in association with the Defense Research Section of the Chemical Corps led to the preparation of Hopcalite, an effective mixed-oxide catalyst for the low temperature oxidation of carbon monoxide, which is still in use today.

Bray married Nora Thomas on 30 June 1914. They had a daughter, Margaret.

He was promoted associate professor in 1916 and appointed full professor in 1918. In 1919, he was Associate Director of the Fixed Nitrogen Research Laboratory. Bray returned to the University in 1920 and, in the next 26 years published 45 papers. Amongst them was one describing a chemical clock reaction, later known as the Bray–Liebhafsky reaction.

William Crowell Bray died on 24 February 1946, following a heart attack the previous year. He was buried at the Chapel of Memories Columbarium and Mausoleum in Oakland, California. Nora, who died in 1966, is interred in the same grave.

== Academic society memberships ==
- The National Academy of Sciences
- The American Academy of Arts and Sciences the American Chemical Society
- The American Electrochemical Society
- The American Association for the Advancement of Science
