= Noel Hush =

Australian chemist (1924–2019)

Professor Noel Hush AO FRS FAA FRACI FRSN
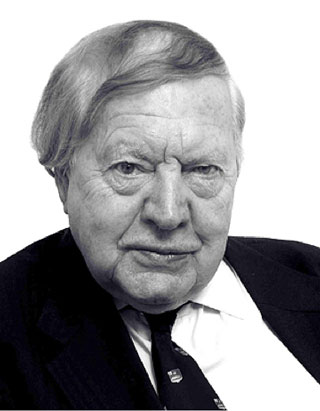
- Hush in 2006
- Born: Noel Sydney Hush; 15 December 1924; Sydney, Australia
- Died: 20 March 2019 (aged 94)
- Known for: Electron transfer, molecular electronics, finite-field response
- Awards: Fellow of the Royal Society (FRS) (1988); Centenary Medal of the Royal Society of Chemistry (1988); Welch Award (1988); 2011 Foreign Associate of the National Academy of Sciences of USA (2011); 2014 Ahmed Zewail Prize for Molecular Science (2014)
- Scientific career
- Fields: Theoretical chemistry, chemical physics
- Institutions: University of Manchester, University of Bristol, University of Sydney
- Thesis: The electronic spectrum of pentacene in five states of ionization: theory and experiment
- Doctoral advisors: (DSc 1959) H.C. Longuet-Higgins FRS and M.H.L. Pryce FRS

Noel Sydney Hush (15 December 1924 – 20 March 2019) was an Australian chemist at the University of Sydney.

== Career ==
Hush was born in Sydney on 15 December 1924 and obtained his BSc hons (1945) and MSc (1948) at the University of Sydney, where he worked as a research fellow in the Department of Chemistry (1945–49). He then accepted an invitation from M. G. Evans FRS to work in England as an assistant lecturer at the University of Manchester (1950–54) in the department created by Michael Polanyi. He was subsequently lecturer and then reader in the Department of Chemistry, University of Bristol (1955–71).

He returned to Australia in 1971 to found the Department of Theoretical Chemistry at the University of Sydney, the first such department in Australia. In 1989 he became a full-time research-only emeritus professor. He has held numerous prestigious visiting scientist positions at universities in Australia, the UK, and the US.

=== Adiabatic electron transfer ===
A unifying theme of Hush's research is explanation of chemical electron transfer. This is the basis of oxidation–reduction processes, which are ubiquitous in nature in both the inorganic and biological spheres. The mechanism of these reactions—the simplest of which proceed without making or breaking chemical bonds—remained unknown until the mid-1950s, when several independent theoretical studies showed that it was due to modulation of coupling between electronic and vibrational motions. According to his Royal Society election citation, Hush's research in the area of homogeneous and heterogeneous electron transfer showed that electron transfer occurring during a collision between a molecule and either another molecule or an electrode surface occurs adiabatically on a continuous potential-energy surface, and that electron transfer can occur by either optical or thermal mechanisms with the corresponding rates being closely connected.

== Awards ==
- 2014 Ahmed Zewail Prize for Molecular Science
- 2011 Foreign Associate of the National Academy of Sciences of USA.
- 2010 Fellow of the Royal Society of New South Wales (FRNS)
- 2007 Welch Award
- 2005 Physical Division Medal of the Royal Australian Chemical Institute (FRACI)
- 2001 Australian Federation Centenary Medal
- 2000 Inaugural David Craig Medal and Lecture of the Australian Academy of Science
- 1999 Foreign Member of the American Academy of Arts and Sciences
- 1994 Matthew Flinders Medal and Lecture from the Australian Academy of Science
- 1993 Officer of the Order of Australia (AO)
- 1990 Centenary Medal of the Royal Society of Chemistry
- 1988 Fellow of the Royal Society (FRS)
- 1977 Fellow of the Australian Academy of Science (FAA)
- 1977 Fellow of the Royal Australian Chemical Institute (FRACI)

== See also ==
- Electron transfer
