= Redox therapy =

Experimental therapy

Redox therapy is an experimental therapy that aims to effect an outcome by modifying the levels of pro-oxidant and antioxidant agents in cells. The term "redox" is a contraction of "reduction-oxidation". For cancer patients, the therapy is predicated on the idea that the redox state of cells may have an effect on cancer development.

Historically, and in alternative medicine, the term "redox therapy" has also been used to describe the practice of administering high dosages of vitamins; in a 1984 study, high dosages of Menadione and Vitamin C were given to a patient.

== See also ==
- Antioxidant therapy
- Orthomolecular medicine
- Vitamin C megadosage
