= Redox =

Chemical reaction involving changes in oxidation state

Sodium "gives" one valence electron to fluorine, bonding them to form sodium fluoride. The sodium atom is oxidized, and fluorine is reduced.

When a few drops of glycerol (mild reducing agent) are added to powdered potassium permanganate (strong oxidizing agent), a violent redox reaction accompanied by self-ignition starts.

Example of a reduction–oxidation reaction between sodium and chlorine, with the OIL RIG mnemonic

Redox (/ˈrɛdɒks/ RED-oks, /ˈriːdɒks/ REE-doks, reduction–oxidation or oxidation–reduction) is a type of chemical reaction in which the oxidation states of the reactants change. Oxidation is the loss of electrons or an increase in the oxidation state. Reduction is the gain of electrons or a decrease in the oxidation state. The oxidation and reduction processes occur simultaneously in the chemical reaction.

Redox reactions fall into two classes. In electron transfer, a single electron usually flows from the atom, ion, or molecule being oxidized to the one being reduced; this is often described in terms of redox couples and electrode potentials. In atom transfer, an atom passes from one substrate to another; for example, in the rusting of iron the oxidation state of the iron atoms increases as the metal converts to an oxide and oxygen is reduced as it absorbs the released electrons.

Redox reactions occur throughout nature and industry. Cellular respiration and photosynthesis, combustion, and the corrosion of metals all proceed through redox chemistry, as do the reactions that power batteries and other electrochemical cells. Industry uses redox reactions to extract metals from their ores by smelting, to electroplate objects, and to manufacture chemicals such as nitric acid. In soils, sediments, and water, redox gradients drive the biogeochemical cycling of elements.

Oxidation-reduction equations may be balanced by a method which involves determining the numbers of electrons gained in the reduction and lost in the oxidation, and then choosing coefficients which make the total number of electrons gained equal the number of electrons lost.

== Terminology ==
"Redox" is a portmanteau of "reduction" and "oxidation". The term first appeared in a 1928 article by Leonor Michaelis and Louis B. Flexner.

Oxidation is a process in which a substance loses electrons. Reduction is a process in which a substance gains electrons.

The processes of oxidation and reduction occur simultaneously and cannot occur independently. In redox processes, the reductant transfers electrons to the oxidant. Thus, in the reaction, the reductant or reducer or reducing agent loses electrons and is oxidized, while the oxidant or oxidizer or oxidizing agent gains electrons and is reduced.

The pair of an oxidizing and reducing agent that is involved in a particular reaction is called a redox pair. A redox couple is a reducing species and its corresponding oxidizing form, e.g., Fe^{2+}/ Fe^{3+}.The oxidation alone and the reduction alone are each called a half-reaction because two half-reactions always occur together to form a whole reaction.

In electrochemical reactions the oxidation and reduction processes do occur simultaneously but are separated in space.

Although oxidation is commonly associated with forming oxides, other chemical species can serve the same function; in hydrogenation, bonds such as C=C are reduced by the transfer of hydrogen atoms.

=== Oxidants ===
The international pictogram for oxidizing chemicals

Oxidation originally implied a reaction with oxygen to form an oxide. Later, the term expanded to encompass chemical reactions similar to those with oxygen. Ultimately, the meaning became generalized to include all processes that involve the loss of electrons or the increase in the oxidation state of a chemical species. Substances that have the ability to oxidize other substances (cause them to lose electrons) are said to be oxidative or oxidizing, and are known as oxidizing agents, oxidants, or oxidizers. The oxidant removes electrons from another substance, and is thus itself reduced. Because it "accepts" electrons, the oxidizing agent is also called an electron acceptor. Oxidants are usually chemical substances with elements in high oxidation states (e.g., N_{2}O_{4}, MnO^{−}_{4}, CrO_{3}, Cr_{2}O^{2−}_{7}, OsO_{4}), or else highly electronegative elements (e.g. O_{2}, F_{2}, Cl_{2}, Br_{2}, I_{2}) that can gain extra electrons by oxidizing another substance.

Oxidizers are oxidants, but the term is mainly reserved for sources of oxygen, particularly in the context of explosions. Nitric acid is a strong oxidizer.

=== Reductants ===
Substances that have the ability to reduce other substances (cause them to gain electrons) are said to be reductive or reducing and are known as reducing agents, reductants, or reducers. The reductant transfers electrons to another substance and is thus itself oxidized. Because it donates electrons, the reducing agent is also called an electron donor. Electron donors can also form charge transfer complexes with electron acceptors. The word reduction originally referred to the loss in weight upon heating a metallic ore such as a metal oxide to extract the metal. In other words, ore was "reduced" to metal. Antoine Lavoisier demonstrated that this loss of weight was due to the loss of oxygen as a gas. Later, scientists realized that the metal atom gains electrons in this process. The meaning of reduction then became generalized to include all processes that involve a gain of electrons. Reducing equivalent refers to chemical species that transfer the equivalent of one electron in redox reactions. The term is common in biochemistry. A reducing equivalent can be an electron or a hydrogen atom as a hydride ion.

Reductants in chemistry are very diverse. Electropositive elemental metals, such as lithium, sodium, magnesium, iron, zinc, and aluminium, are good reducing agents. These metals donate electrons relatively readily.

Hydride transfer reagents, such as NaBH_{4} and LiAlH_{4}, reduce by atom transfer: they transfer the equivalent of hydride or H^{−}. These reagents are widely used in the reduction of carbonyl compounds to alcohols. A related method of reduction involves the use of hydrogen gas (H_{2}) as sources of H atoms.

=== Electronation and de-electronation ===
The electrochemist John Bockris proposed the words electronation and de-electronation to describe reduction and oxidation processes, respectively, when they occur at electrodes. These words are analogous to protonation and deprotonation. IUPAC has recognized the terms electronation and de-electronation.

== Rates, mechanisms, and energies ==
Redox reactions can occur slowly, as in the formation of rust, or rapidly, as in the case of burning fuel. Electron transfer reactions are generally fast, occurring within the time of mixing.

The mechanisms of atom-transfer reactions are highly variable because many kinds of atoms can be transferred, and such reactions can involve several steps. Electron-transfer reactions, by contrast, proceed by two distinct pathways. In inner-sphere transfer, the two reactants share a bridging ligand through which the electron passes; in outer-sphere transfer, the electron moves between reactants whose coordination shells remain intact. Henry Taube received the 1983 Nobel Prize in Chemistry for distinguishing these pathways through experiments on metal complexes.

The rate of an outer-sphere electron transfer is described by Marcus theory, developed by Rudolph A. Marcus. The theory expresses the activation energy in terms of two quantities: the standard free-energy change of the reaction and the reorganization energy, the energy needed to distort the reactants and the surrounding solvent into the configuration of the products before the electron moves. It predicts an "inverted region", in which the rate falls once the driving force exceeds the reorganization energy. Marcus received the 1992 Nobel Prize in Chemistry for the theory.

Analysis of bond energies and ionization energies in water allows calculation of the thermodynamic aspects of redox reactions.

== Standard electrode potentials (reduction potentials) ==
Each half-reaction has a standard electrode potential (E^{o}_{cell}), which is equal to the potential difference or voltage at equilibrium under standard conditions of an electrochemical cell in which the cathode reaction is the half-reaction considered, and the anode is a standard hydrogen electrode where hydrogen is oxidized:

1/2 H_{2} → H^{+} + e^{−}

The electrode potential of each half-reaction is also known as its reduction potential (E^{o}_{red}), or potential when the half-reaction takes place at a cathode. The reduction potential is a measure of the tendency of the oxidizing agent to be reduced. Its value is zero for H^{+} + e^{−} → 1/2H_{2} by definition, positive for oxidizing agents stronger than H^{+} (e.g., +2.866 V for F_{2}) and negative for oxidizing agents that are weaker than H^{+} (e.g., −0.763V for Zn^{2+}).

For a redox reaction that takes place in a cell, the potential difference is:

E^{o}_{cell} = E^{o}_{cathode} − E^{o}_{anode}

However, the potential of the reaction at the anode is sometimes expressed as an oxidation potential:

E^{o}_{ox} = −E^{o}_{red}

The oxidation potential is a measure of the tendency of the reducing agent to be oxidized but does not represent the physical potential at an electrode. With this notation, the cell voltage equation is written with a plus sign

E^{o}_{cell} = E^{o}_{red(cathode)} + E^{o}_{ox(anode)}

== Examples of redox reactions ==
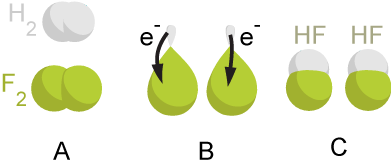
Illustration of a redox reaction

In the reaction between hydrogen and fluorine, hydrogen is being oxidized and fluorine is being reduced:

H_{2} + F_{2} → 2 HF

This spontaneous reaction releases a large amount of energy (542 kJ per 2 g of hydrogen) because two H-F bonds are much stronger than one H-H bond and one F-F bond. This reaction can be analyzed as two half-reactions. The oxidation reaction converts hydrogen to protons:

H_{2} → 2 H^{+} + 2 e^{−}

The reduction reaction converts fluorine to the fluoride anion:

F_{2} + 2 e^{−} → 2 F^{−}

The half-reactions are combined so that the electrons cancel:

H_{2}	→	2 H^{+} + 2 e^{−}
F_{2} + 2 e^{−}	→	2 F^{−}
H_{2} + F_{2}	→	2 H^{+} + 2 F^{−}

The protons and fluoride combine to form hydrogen fluoride in a non-redox reaction:

2 H^{+} + 2 F^{−} → 2 HF

The overall reaction is:

H_{2} + F_{2} → 2 HF

=== Metal displacement ===
A redox reaction is the force behind an electrochemical cell like the Galvanic cell pictured. The battery is made out of a zinc electrode in a ZnSO_{4} solution connected with a wire and a porous disk to a copper electrode in a CuSO_{4} solution.

In this type of reaction, a metal atom in a compound or solution is replaced by an atom of another metal. For example, copper is deposited when zinc metal is placed in a copper(II) sulfate solution:

Zn(s) + CuSO_{4}(aq) → ZnSO_{4}(aq) + Cu(s)

In the above reaction, zinc metal displaces the copper(II) ion from the copper sulfate solution, thus liberating free copper metal. The reaction is spontaneous and releases 213 kJ per 65 g of zinc.

The ionic equation for this reaction is:

Zn + Cu^{2+} → Zn^{2+} + Cu

As two half-reactions, it is seen that the zinc is oxidized:

Zn → Zn^{2+} + 2 e^{−}

And the copper is reduced:

Cu^{2+} + 2 e^{−} → Cu

=== Other examples ===
- The reduction of nitrate to nitrogen in the presence of an acid (denitrification):

2 NO^{−}_{3} + 10 e^{−} + 12 H^{+} → N_{2} + 6 H_{2}O

- The combustion of hydrocarbons, such as in an internal combustion engine, produces water, carbon dioxide, some partially oxidized forms such as carbon monoxide, and heat energy. Complete oxidation of materials containing carbon produces carbon dioxide.
- The stepwise oxidation of a hydrocarbon by oxygen, in organic chemistry, produces water and, successively: an alcohol, an aldehyde or a ketone, a carboxylic acid, and then a peroxide.

=== Corrosion and rusting ===
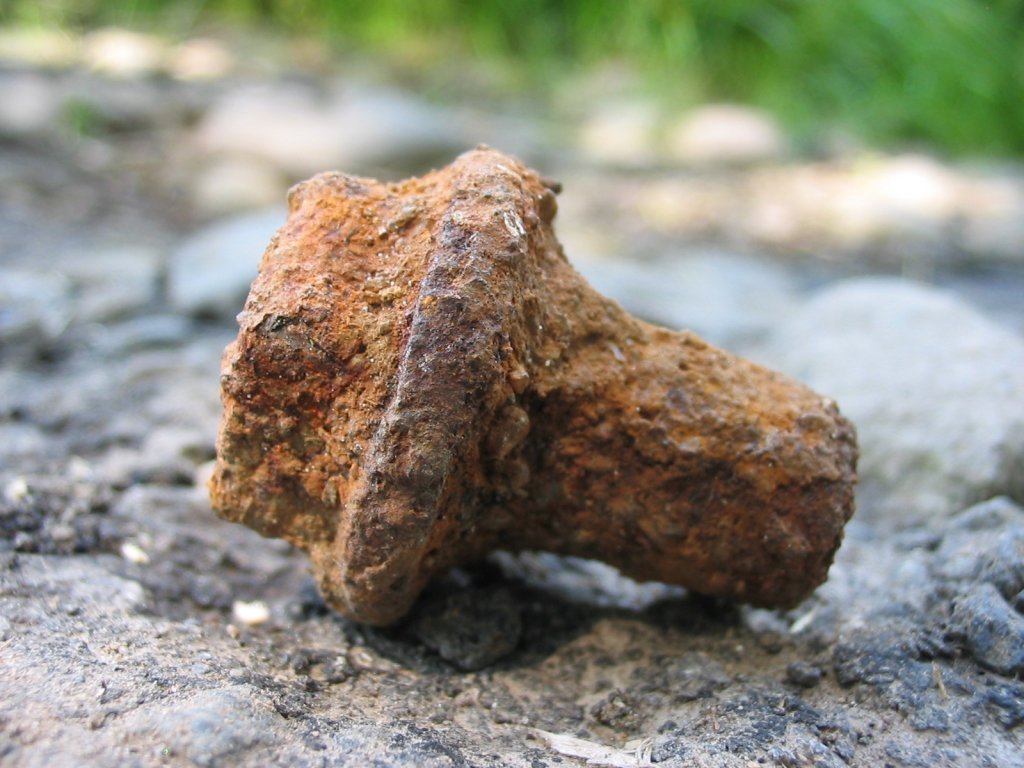
Oxides, such as iron(III) oxide or rust, which consists of hydrated iron(III) oxides Fe_{2}O_{3}·nH_{2}O and iron(III) oxide-hydroxide (FeO(OH), Fe(OH)_{3}), form when oxygen combines with other elements.

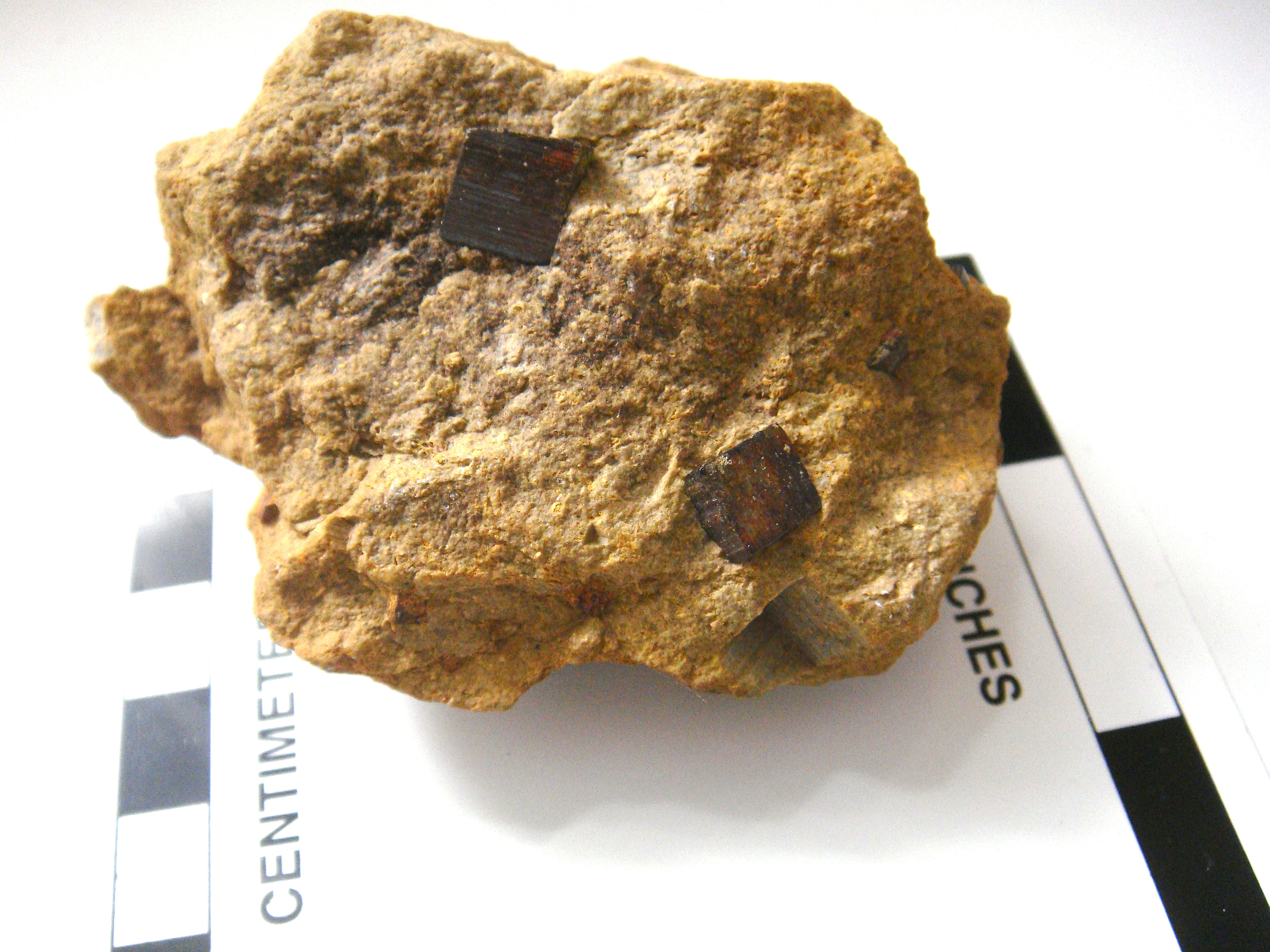
Iron rusting in pyrite cubes

- The term corrosion refers to the electrochemical oxidation of metals in reaction with an oxidant such as oxygen. Rusting, the formation of iron oxides, is a well-known example of electrochemical corrosion: it forms as a result of the oxidation of iron metal. Common rust often refers to iron(III) oxide, formed in the following chemical reaction:

4 Fe + 3 O_{2} → 2 Fe_{2}O_{3}

- The oxidation of iron(II) to iron(III) by hydrogen peroxide in the presence of an acid:

Fe^{2+} → Fe^{3+} + e^{−}
H_{2}O_{2} + 2 e^{−} → 2 OH^{−}

Here the overall equation involves adding the reduction equation to twice the oxidation equation, so that the electrons cancel:

2 Fe^{2+} + H_{2}O_{2} + 2 H^{+} → 2 Fe^{3+} + 2 H_{2}O

=== Disproportionation ===
A disproportionation reaction is one in which a single substance is both oxidized and reduced. For example, thiosulfate ion with sulfur in oxidation state +2 can react in the presence of acid to form elemental sulfur (oxidation state 0) and sulfur dioxide (oxidation state +4).

S_{2}O^{2−}_{3} + 2 H^{+} → S + SO_{2} + H_{2}O

Thus one sulfur atom is reduced from +2 to 0, while the other is oxidized from +2 to +4.

== Redox reactions in industry ==
Cathodic protection is a technique used to control the corrosion of a metal surface by making it the cathode of an electrochemical cell. A simple method of protection connects protected metal to a more easily corroded "sacrificial anode" to act as the anode. The sacrificial metal, instead of the protected metal, then corrodes.

Oxidation is used in many industries, such as in the production of cleaning products and oxidizing ammonia to produce nitric acid, whose principal industrial route is the catalytic oxidation of ammonia in the Ostwald process.

Redox reactions are the foundation of electrochemical cells, which can generate electrical energy or support electrosynthesis. Metal ores often contain metals in oxidized states, such as oxides or sulfides, from which the pure metals are extracted by smelting at high temperatures in the presence of a reducing agent. The process of electroplating uses redox reactions to coat objects with a thin layer of a material, as in chrome-plated automotive parts, silver plating cutlery, galvanization and gold-plated jewelry.

== Redox reactions in biology ==
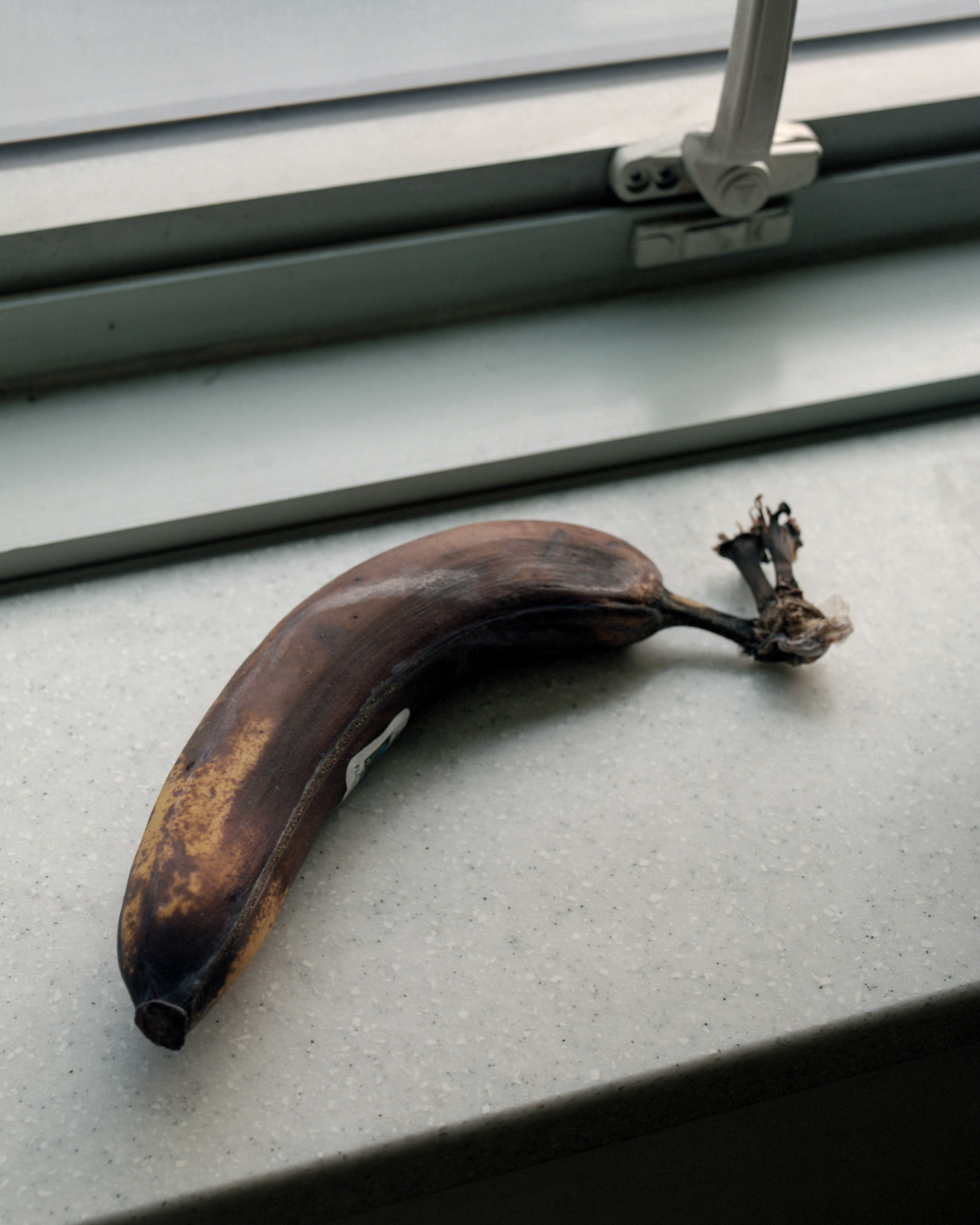
Enzymatic browning is an example of a redox reaction that takes place in most fruits and vegetables.

Ascorbic acid (reduced form of vitamin C)

Dehydroascorbic acid (oxidized form of vitamin C)

Many essential biological processes involve redox reactions. Before some of these processes can begin, iron must be assimilated from the environment.

Aerobic cellular respiration, for instance, is the oxidation of substrates (in this case, glucose [C_{6}H_{12}O_{6}]) and the reduction of oxygen to water. The summary equation for aerobic respiration is:

C_{6}H_{12}O_{6} + 6 O_{2} → 6 CO_{2} + 6 H_{2}O + Energy

The process of cellular respiration also depends heavily on the reduction of NAD^{+} to NADH and the reverse reaction (the oxidation of NADH to NAD^{+}). Photosynthesis and cellular respiration are complementary, but photosynthesis is not the reverse of the redox reaction in cellular respiration:

6 CO_{2} + 6 H_{2}O + light energy → C_{6}H_{12}O_{6} + 6 O_{2}

Biological energy is frequently stored and released using redox reactions. Photosynthesis involves the reduction of carbon dioxide into sugars and the oxidation of water into molecular oxygen. The reverse reaction, respiration, oxidizes sugars to produce carbon dioxide and water. As intermediate steps, the reduced carbon compounds are used to reduce nicotinamide adenine dinucleotide (NAD^{+}) to NADH, which then contributes to the creation of a proton gradient, which drives the synthesis of adenosine triphosphate (ATP) and is maintained by the reduction of oxygen. In animal cells, mitochondria perform similar functions.

The term redox state is often used to describe the balance of GSH/GSSG, NAD^{+}/NADH and NADP^{+}/NADPH in a biological system such as a cell or organ. The redox state is reflected in the balance of several sets of metabolites (e.g., lactate and pyruvate, beta-hydroxybutyrate and acetoacetate), whose interconversion is dependent on these ratios. Redox mechanisms also control some cellular processes. Redox proteins and their genes must be co-located for redox regulation according to the CoRR hypothesis for the function of DNA in mitochondria and chloroplasts.

=== Redox cycling ===
Many aromatic compounds are enzymatically reduced to form free radicals that contain one more electron than their parent compounds. In general, the electron donor is a flavoenzyme or one of its coenzymes. Once formed, these anion free radicals reduce molecular oxygen to superoxide and regenerate the unchanged parent compound. The net reaction is the oxidation of the flavoenzyme's coenzymes and the reduction of molecular oxygen to form superoxide. This catalytic behavior has been described as a futile cycle or redox cycling.

== Redox reactions in geology ==
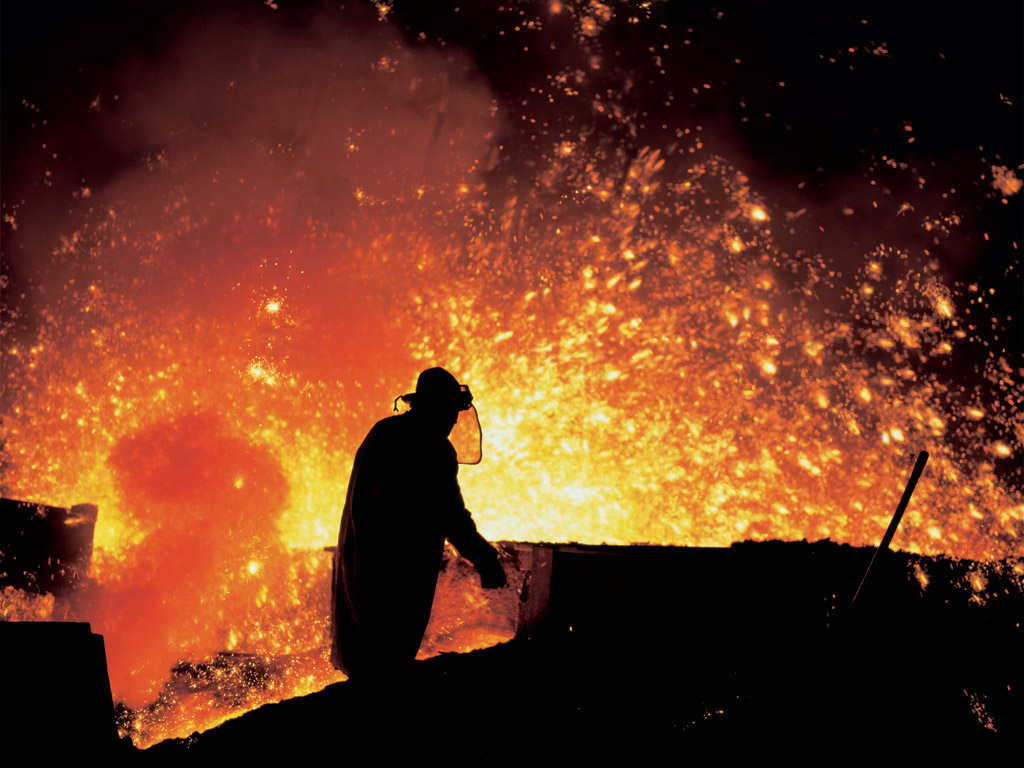
Blast furnaces of Třinec Iron and Steel Works, Czech Republic

Minerals are generally oxidized derivatives of metals. Iron is mined as ores such as magnetite (Fe_{3}O_{4}) and hematite (Fe_{2}O_{3}). Titanium is mined as its dioxide, usually in the form of rutile (TiO_{2}). These oxides must be reduced to obtain the corresponding metals, often achieved by heating these oxides with carbon or carbon monoxide as reducing agents. Blast furnaces are the reactors where iron oxides and coke (a form of carbon) are combined to produce molten iron. The main chemical reaction producing the molten iron is:

Fe_{2}O_{3} + 3 CO → 2 Fe + 3 CO_{2}

== Redox reactions in soils ==
Electron transfer reactions are central to many processes and properties in soils, and redox potential, quantified as Eh (platinum electrode potential (voltage) relative to the standard hydrogen electrode) or pe (analogous to pH as −log electron activity), is a master variable, along with pH, that controls and is governed by chemical reactions and biological processes. Early theoretical research with applications to flooded soils and paddy rice production shaped subsequent work on thermodynamic aspects of redox and plant root growth in soils. Later work extended it to redox reactions related to heavy metal oxidation state changes, pedogenesis and morphology, organic compound degradation and formation, free radical chemistry, wetland delineation, soil remediation, and methods for characterizing the redox status of soils.

== Mnemonics ==
The key terms involved in redox can be confusing. For example, a reagent that is oxidized loses electrons; however, that reagent is referred to as the reducing agent. Likewise, a reagent that is reduced gains electrons and is referred to as the oxidizing agent. These mnemonics are commonly used by students to help memorise the terminology:

- "OIL RIG"—oxidation is loss of electrons, reduction is gain of electrons
- "LEO the lion says GER [grr]"—loss of electrons is oxidation, gain of electrons is reduction
- "LEORA says GEROA"—the loss of electrons is called oxidation (reducing agent); the gain of electrons is called reduction (oxidizing agent).
- "RED CAT" and "AN OX", or "AnOx RedCat" ("an ox-red cat")—reduction occurs at the cathode and the anode is for oxidation
- "RED CAT gains what AN OX loses" – reduction at the cathode gains (electrons) what anode oxidation loses (electrons)
- "PANIC" – Positive Anode and Negative is Cathode. This applies to electrolytic cells that release stored electricity, and can be recharged with electricity. PANIC does not apply to cells that can be recharged with redox materials. These galvanic or voltaic cells, such as fuel cells, produce electricity from internal redox reactions. Here, the positive electrode is the cathode and the negative is the anode.

== See also ==
- Anaerobic respiration
- Bessemer process
- Bioremediation
- Calvin cycle
- Chemical equation
- Chemical looping combustion
- Citric acid cycle
- Electrochemical series
- Electrolysis
- Electron transport chain
- Membrane potential
- Microbial fuel cell
- Murburn concept
- Nucleophilic abstraction
- Organic redox reaction
- Oxidative addition and reductive elimination
- Oxidative phosphorylation
- Partial oxidation
- Pro-oxidant
- Redox gradient
- Redox therapy
- Reducing atmosphere
- Reduction potential
- Thermic reaction
- Transmetalation
- Sulfur cycle
