= Intervalence charge transfer =

Type of charge-transfer band in chemistry

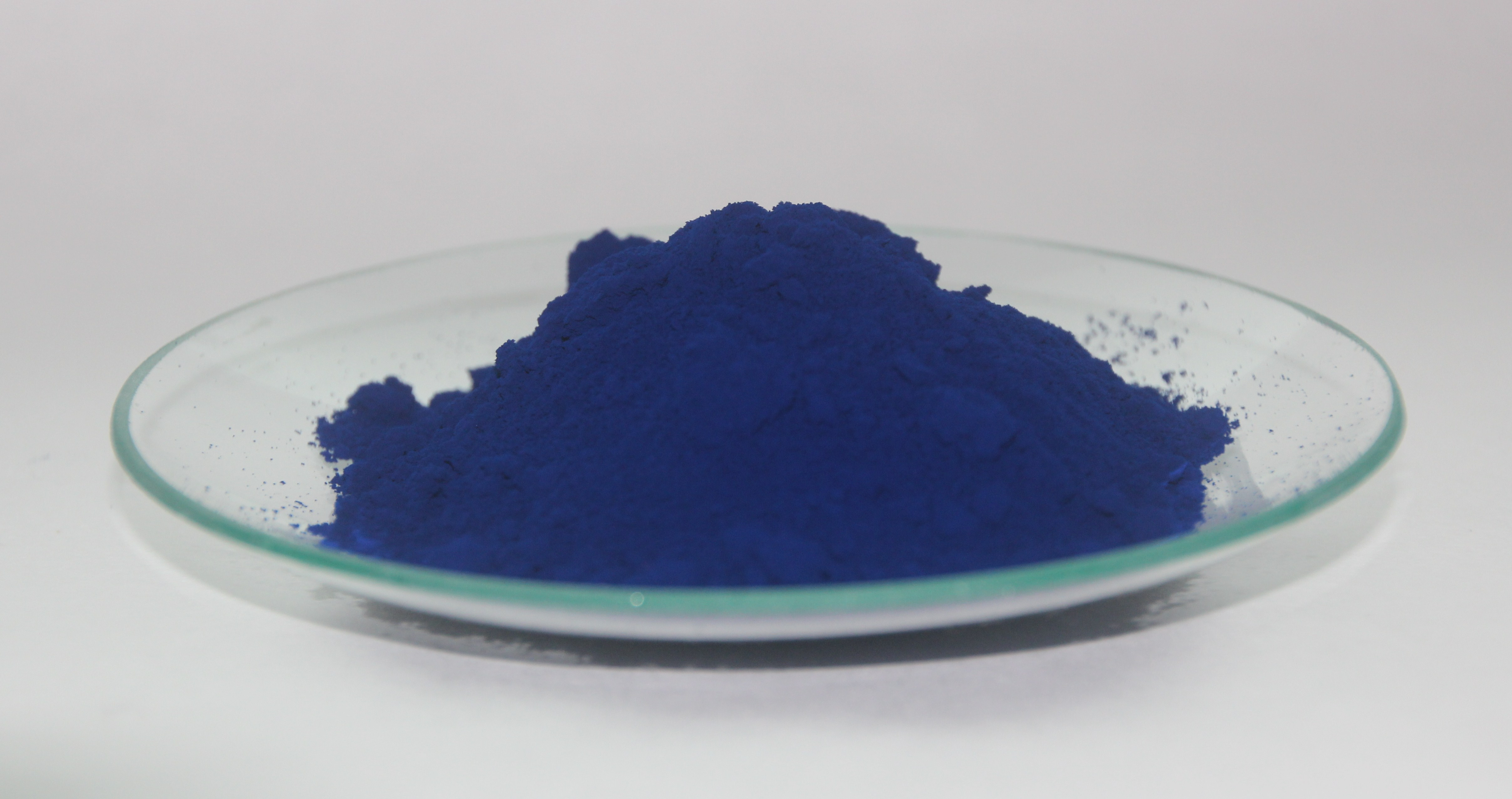
The intense blue color of Prussian blue is a consequence of an intervalence charge transfer band.

In chemistry, intervalence charge transfer, often abbreviated IVCT or even IT, is a type of charge-transfer band that is associated with mixed valence compounds. It is most common for systems with two metal sites differing only in oxidation state. Quite often such electron transfer reverses the oxidation states of the sites. The term is frequently extended to the case of metal-to-metal charge transfer between non-equivalent metal centres. The transition produces a characteristically intense absorption in the electromagnetic spectrum. The band is usually found in the visible or near infrared region of the spectrum and is broad.

The process can be described as follows:

L_{n}M^{+}-bridge-M'L_{n} + hν → L_{n}M-bridge-M'^{+}L_{n}

The Creutz–Taube complex exhibits an intense absorption band at 1570 nm attributed to a intervalence charge-transfer band.

== Mixed valency and the IT band ==
Since the energy states of valence tautomers affect the IVCT band, the strength of electronic interaction between the sites, known as α (the mixing coefficient), can be determined by analysis of the IVCT band. Depending on the value of α, mixed valence complexes are classified into three groups:

- class I: α ~ 0, the complex has no interaction between redox sites. No IVCT band is observed. The oxidation states of the two metal sites are distinct and do not readily interconvert.
- class II: 0 < α < $\scriptstyle 1/\sqrt{2}$ = 0.707, intermediate interaction between sites. An IVCT band is observed. The oxidation states of the two metal sites are distinct, but they readily interconvert. This is by far the most common class of intervalence complexes.
- class III: α > $\scriptstyle 1/\sqrt{2}$ = 0.707, interaction between redox sites is very strong. It is better to consider these sites as one united site, not as two isolated sites. An IVCT band is observed. The oxidation states of the two metal sites are essentially equivalent. In these situations, the two metals are often best described as having the same half integer oxidation state.
