= Electron transfer =

Relocation of an electron from an atom or molecule to another

Example of a reduction–oxidation reaction between sodium and chlorine, with the OIL RIG mnemonic

Electron transfer (ET) occurs when an electron relocates from an atom, ion, or molecule, to another such chemical entity. ET describes the mechanism by which electrons are transferred in redox reactions.

Electrochemical processes are ET reactions. ET reactions are relevant to photosynthesis and respiration and commonly involve transition metal complexes. In organic chemistry ET is a step in some industrial polymerization reactions. It is foundational to photoredox catalysis.

== Classes of electron transfer ==
=== Inner-sphere electron transfer ===
In inner-sphere ET, two redox centers are covalently linked during the ET. This bridge can be permanent, in which case the electron transfer event is termed intramolecular electron transfer. More commonly, however, the covalent linkage is transitory, forming just prior to the ET and then disconnecting following the ET event. In such cases, the electron transfer is termed intermolecular electron transfer. A famous example of an inner sphere ET process that proceeds via a transitory bridged intermediate is the reduction of [CoCl(NH_{3})_{5}]^{2+} by [Cr(H_{2}O)_{6}]^{2+}. In this case, the chloride ligand is the bridging ligand that covalently connects the redox partners.

=== Outer-sphere electron transfer ===
In outer-sphere ET reactions, the participating redox centers are not linked via any bridge during the ET event. Instead, the electron "hops" through space from the reducing center to the acceptor. Outer sphere electron transfer can occur between different chemical species or between identical chemical species that differ only in their oxidation state. The latter process is termed self-exchange. As an example, self-exchange describes the degenerate reaction between permanganate and its one-electron reduced relative manganate:

[MnO_{4}]^{−} + [Mn*O_{4}]^{2−} → [MnO_{4}]^{2−} + [Mn*O_{4}]^{−}

In general, if electron transfer is faster than ligand substitution, the reaction will follow the outer-sphere electron transfer route.

Outer-sphere ET reactions often occur when one/both reactants are inert or if there is no suitable bridging ligand.

A key concept of Marcus theory is that the rates of such self-exchange reactions are mathematically related to the rates of "cross reactions". Cross reactions entail partners that differ by more than their oxidation states. One example (of many thousands) is the reduction of permanganate by iodide to form iodine and manganate.

==== Five steps of an outer sphere reaction ====
1. Reactants diffuse together, forming an "encounter complex", out of their solvent shells => precursor complex (requires work = w_{r})
2. Changing bond lengths, reorganize solvent => activated complex
3. Electron transfer
4. Relaxation of bond lengths, solvent molecules => successor complex
5. Diffusion of products (requires work = w_{p})

=== Heterogeneous electron transfer ===
In heterogeneous electron transfer, an electron moves between a chemical species present in solution and the surface of a solid such as a semi-conducting material or an electrode. Theories addressing heterogeneous electron transfer have applications in electrochemistry and the design of solar cells.

=== Vectorial electron transfer ===
Especially in proteins, electron transfer often involves hopping of an electron from one redox-active center to another one. The hopping pathway, which can be viewed as a vector, guides and facilitates ET within an insulating matrix. Typical redox centers are iron-sulfur clusters, e.g. the 4Fe-4S ferredoxins. These sites are often separated by 7-10 Å, a distance compatible with fast outer-sphere ET. It has been found that the matrix of ET protein plastocyanin (devoid of the redox copper ion) is sufficient to support charge transport with its redox partner photosystem I.

== Theory ==
The first generally accepted theory of ET was developed by Rudolph A. Marcus (Nobel Prize in Chemistry in 1992) to address outer-sphere electron transfer and was based on a transition-state theory approach. The Marcus theory of electron transfer was then extended to include inner-sphere electron transfer by Noel Hush and Marcus. The resultant theory, Marcus-Hush theory, has guided most discussions of electron transfer ever since. Both theories are, however, semiclassical in nature, although they have been extended to fully quantum mechanical treatments by Joshua Jortner, Alexander M. Kuznetsov, and others proceeding from Fermi's golden rule and following earlier work in non-radiative transitions. Furthermore, theories have been put forward to take into account the effects of vibronic coupling on electron transfer, in particular, the PKS theory of electron transfer. In proteins, ET rates are governed by the bond structures: the electrons, in effect, tunnel through the bonds comprising the chain structure of the proteins.

== See also ==
- Electron equivalent
- Electron transfer chain
- Electrochemical reaction mechanism
- Solvated electron
