= Photoredox catalysis =

Branch of photochemistry

Photoredox catalysis is a branch of photochemistry that uses single-electron transfer. Photoredox catalysts are generally drawn from three classes of materials: transition-metal complexes, organic dyes, and semiconductors. While organic photoredox catalysts were dominant throughout the 1990s and early 2000s, soluble transition-metal complexes are more commonly used today.

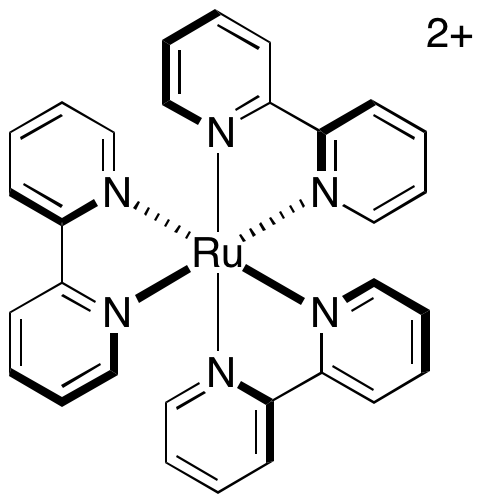
Schematic diagram of [Ru(bipy)_{3}]^{2+}, a typical photoredox catalyst.

== Photochemistry of transition metal sensitizers ==
Sensitizers absorb light to give redox-active excited states. For many metal-based sensitizers, excitation is realized as a metal-to-ligand charge transfer, whereby an electron moves from the metal (e.g., a d orbital) to an orbital localized on the ligands (e.g. the π* orbital of an aromatic ligand). This initial excited electronic state relaxes to a singlet excited state through internal conversion, a process where energy is dissipated as vibrational energy (heat) rather than as electromagnetic radiation. This singlet excited state can relax further by two distinct processes: the catalyst may fluoresce, radiating a photon and returning to the original singlet ground state, or it can move to the lowest energy triplet excited state (a state where two unpaired electrons have the same spin) by a second non-radiative process termed intersystem crossing.

Direct relaxation of the excited triplet to the ground state, termed phosphorescence, requires both emission of a photon and inversion of the spin of the excited electron. This pathway is slow because it is spin-forbidden so the triplet excited state has a substantial average lifetime. For the common photosensitizer, tris-(2,2’-bipyridyl)ruthenium (abbreviated as [Ru(bipy)_{3}]^{2+} or [Ru(bpy)_{3}]^{2+}), the lifetime of the triplet excited state is approximately 1100 ns. This lifetime is sufficient for other relaxation pathways (specifically, electron-transfer pathways) to occur before decay of the catalyst to its ground state.

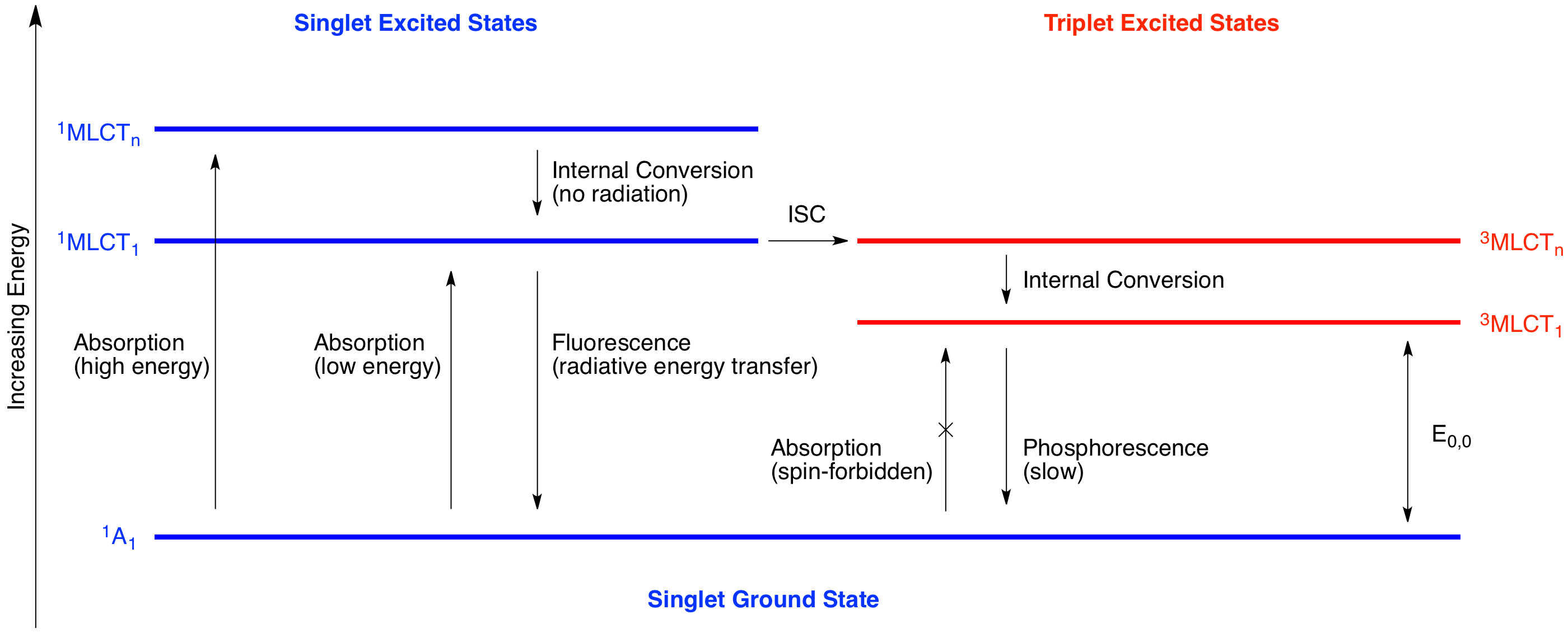
Jablonski diagram illustrating the electronic states accessible during photoexcitation. Note: ISC stands for Intersystem Crossing. E_{0,0} is a measurement of the energy gap between the ground state and the lowest energy triplet state. This parameter is proportional to the phosphorescence wavelength and is used to compute the redox potentials of the triplet state.

The long-lived triplet excited state accessible by photoexcitation is both a more potent reducing agent and a more potent oxidizing agent than the ground state of the catalyst. Since sensitizer is coordinatively saturated, electron transfer must occur by an outer sphere process, where the electron tunnels between the catalyst and the substrate.

=== Outer sphere electron transfer ===
Marcus' theory of outer sphere electron transfer predicts that such a tunneling process will occur most quickly in systems where the electron transfer is thermodynamically favorable (i.e. between strong reductants and oxidants) and where the electron transfer has a low intrinsic barrier.

The intrinsic barrier of electron transfer derives from the Franck–Condon principle, stating that electronic transition takes place more quickly given greater overlap between the initial and final electronic states. Interpreted loosely, this principle suggests that the barrier of an electronic transition is related to the degree to which the system seeks to reorganize. For an electronic transition with a system, the barrier is related to the "overlap" between the initial and final wave functions of the excited electron–i.e. the degree to which the electron needs to "move" in the transition.

In an intermolecular electron transfer, a similar role is played by the degree to which the nuclei seek to move in response to the change in their new electronic environment. Immediately after electron transfer, the nuclear arrangement of the molecule, previously an equilibrium, now represents a vibrationally excited state and must relax to its new equilibrium geometry. Rigid systems, whose geometry is not greatly dependent on oxidation state, therefore experience less vibrational excitation during electron transfer, and have a lower intrinsic barrier. Photocatalysts such as [Ru(bipy)_{3}]^{2+}, are held in a rigid arrangement by flat, bidentate ligands arranged in an octahedral geometry around the metal center. Therefore, the complex does not undergo much reorganization during electron transfer. Since electron transfer of these complexes is fast, it is likely to take place within the duration of the catalyst's active state, i.e. during the lifetime of the triplet excited state.

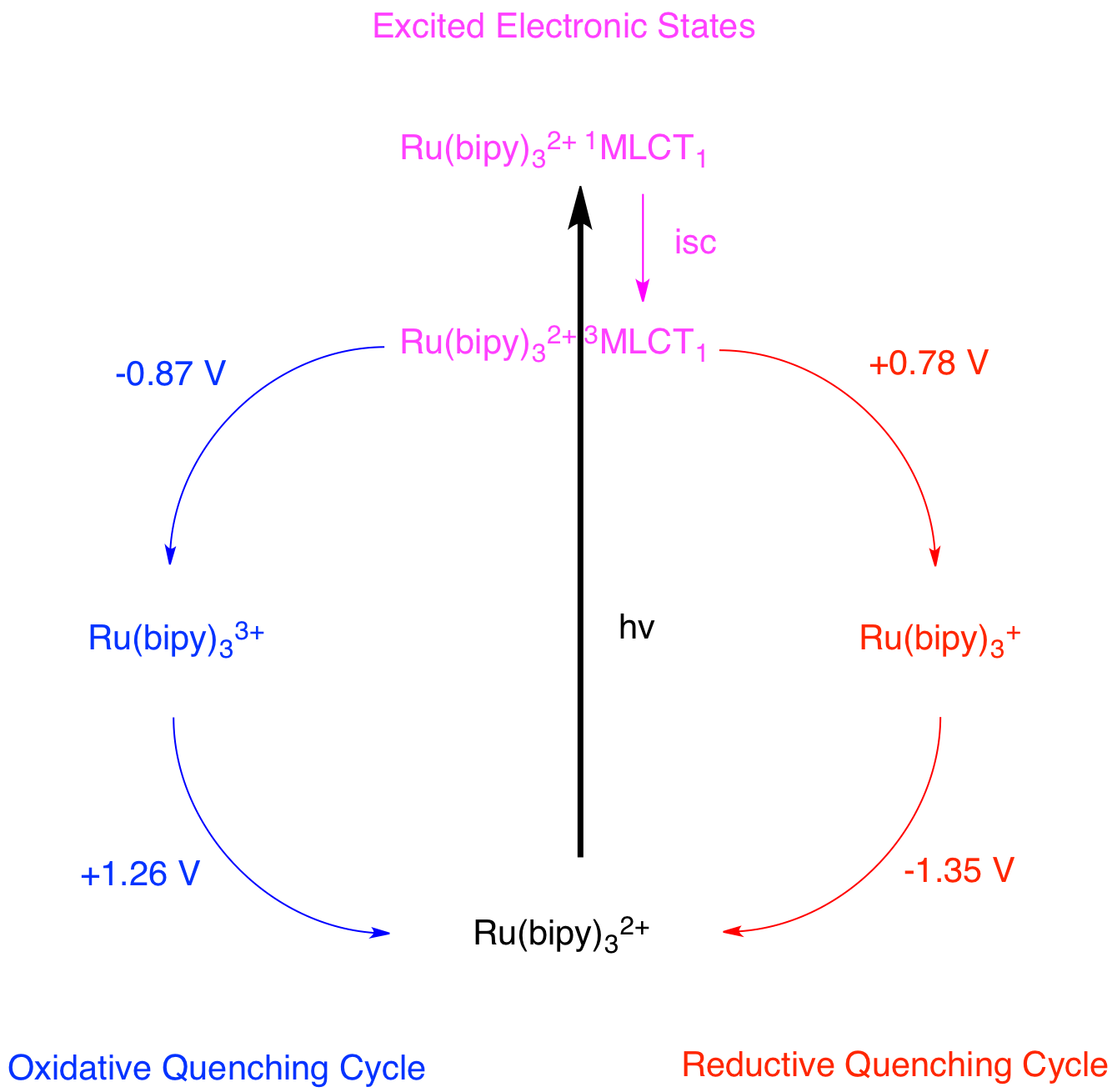

=== Catalyst regeneration ===
To regenerate the ground state, the catalyst must participate in a second outer-sphere electron transfer. In many cases, this electron transfer takes place with a stoichiometric two-electron reductant or oxidant, although in some cases this step involves a second reagent.

Since the electron transfer step of the catalytic cycle takes place from the triplet excited state, it competes with phosphorescence as a relaxation pathway. Stern–Volmer experiments measure the intensity of phosphorescence while varying the concentration of each possible quenching agent. When the concentration of the actual quenching agent is varied, the rate of electron transfer and the degree of phosphorescence is affected. This relationship is modeled by the equation:

$$\left ( \frac{I_0}{I} \right ) = 1 + {k_q} * {\tau_0} \times [ Q ]$$

Here, I and I_{0} denote the emission intensity with and without quenching agent present, k_{q} the rate constant of the quenching process, τ_{0} the excited-state lifetime in the absence of quenching agent and [Q] the concentration of quenching agent. Thus, if the excited-state lifetime of the photoredox catalyst is known from other experiments, the rate constant of quenching in the presence of a single reaction component can be determined by measuring the change in emission intensity as the concentration of quenching agent changes.

== Photophysical properties ==
=== Redox potentials ===
The redox potentials of photoredox catalysts must be matched to the reaction's other components. While ground state redox potentials are easily measured by cyclic voltammetry or other electrochemical methods, measuring the redox potential of an electronically excited state cannot be accomplished directly by these methods. However, two methods exist that allow estimation of the excited-state redox potentials and one method exists for the direct measurement of these potentials. To estimate the excited-state redox potentials, one method is to compare the rates of electron transfer from the excited state to a series of ground-state reactants whose redox potentials are known. A more common method to estimate these potentials is to use an equation developed by Rehm and Weller that describes the excited-state potentials as a correction of the ground-state potentials:

$${{E^*}_{1/2}}^{red} = {E_{1/2}}^{red} + E_{0,0} + w_r$$

$${{E^*}_{1/2}}^{ox} = {E_{1/2}}^{ox} - E_{0,0} + w_r$$

In these formulas, E*_{1/2} represents the reduction or oxidation potential of the excited state, E_{1/2} represents the reduction or oxidation potential of the ground state, E_{0,0} represents the difference in energy between the zeroth vibrational states of the ground and excited states and w_{r} represents the work function, an electrostatic interaction that arises due to the separation of charges that occurs during electron-transfer between two chemical species. The zero-zero excitation energy, E_{0,0} is usually approximated by the corresponding transition in the fluorescence spectrum. This method allows calculation of approximate excited-state redox potentials from more easily measured ground-state redox potentials and spectroscopic data.

Direct measurement of the excited-state redox potentials is possible by applying a method known as phase-modulated voltammetry. This method works by shining light onto an electrochemical cell in order to generate the desired excited-state species, but to modulate the intensity of the light sinusoidally, so that the concentration of the excited-state species is not constant. In fact, the concentration of excited-state species in the cell should change exactly in phase with the intensity of light incident on the electrochemical cell. If the potential applied to the cell is strong enough for electron transfer to occur, the change in concentration of the redox-competent excited state can be measured as an alternating current (AC). Furthermore, the phase shift of the AC current relative to the intensity of the incident light corresponds to the average lifetime of an excited-state species before it engages in electron transfer.

Charts of redox potentials for the most common photoredox catalysts are available for quick access.

=== Ligand electronegativity ===
The relative reducing and oxidizing natures of these photocatalysts can be understood by considering the ligands' electronegativity and the catalyst complex's metal center. More electronegative metals and ligands can stabilize electrons better than their less electronegative counterparts. Therefore, complexes with more electronegative ligands are more oxidizing than less electronegative ligand complexes. For example, the ligands 2,2'-bipyridine and 2,2'-phenylpyridine are isoelectronic structures, containing the same number and arrangement of electrons. Phenylpyridine replaces one of the nitrogen atoms in bipyridine with a carbon atom. Carbon is less electronegative than nitrogen is, so it holds electrons less tightly. Since the remainder of the ligand molecule is identical and phenylpyridine holds electrons less tightly than bipyridine, it is more strongly electron-donating and less electronegative as a ligand. Hence, complexes with phenylpyridine ligands are more strongly reducing and less strongly oxidizing than equivalent complexes with bipyridine ligands.

Similarly, a fluorinated phenylpyridine ligand is more electronegative than phenylpyridine so complexes with fluorine-containing ligands are more strongly oxidizing and less strongly reducing than equivalent unsubstituted phenylpyridine complexes. The metal center's electronic influence on the complex is more complex than the ligand effect. According to the Pauling scale of electronegativity, both ruthenium and iridium have an electronegativity of 2.2. If this was the sole factor relevant to redox potentials, then complexes of ruthenium and iridium with the same ligands should be equally powerful photoredox catalysts. However, considering the Rehm-Weller equation, the spectroscopic properties of the metal play a role in determining the redox properties of the excited state. In particular, the parameter E_{0,0} is related to the emission wavelength of the complex and therefore, to the size of the Stokes shift - the difference in energy between the maximum absorption and emission of a molecule. Typically, ruthenium complexes have large Stokes shifts and hence, low energy emission wavelengths and small zero-zero excitation energies when compared to iridium complexes. In effect, while ground-state ruthenium complexes can be potent reductants, the excited-state complex is a far less potent reductant or oxidant than its equivalent iridium complex. This makes iridium preferred for the development of general organic transformations because the stronger redox potentials of the excited catalyst allows the use of weaker stoichiometric reductants and oxidants or the use of less reactive substrates.

Counter-ion identity

It is often the case that these photocatalysts are balanced with a counter-ion, as is the case with the example complex tris-(2,2’-bipyridyl)ruthenium which is accompanied by two anions to balance the overall charge of the ion pair to zero. However, there are transition metal photoredox catalysts that exist without a counter-ion such as tris(2-phenylpyridine)iridium (often abbreviated Ir(ppy)_{3}). The significance of these counter-ions are dependent on the ion association between the photoredox catalyst and its counter-ion(s) and is dependent on the solvent used for the reaction. Although photophysical properties such as redox potential, excitation energy, and ligand electronegative have often been considered key parameters for the use and reactivity of these complexes, counter-ion identity has been shown to play a significant role in low-polarity solvents. Particularly, it has been shown that having a tightly associated counter-ion increases the rate of electron-transfer when reducing a substrate but significantly reduces the rate of electron-transfer when oxidizing a substrate. This is believed to occur because the counter-ion essentially "blocks" the electron-transfer into the photoredox complex by shielding the more positively charged region of the complex; whereas, having the tight counter-ion association pushes the electron density further from the photoredox catalyst's metal-center, making it easier to be transferred from the catalyst (of course this only applies to the case where the photoredox catalyst is a cation and the counter-ion is an anion). Counter-ion identity thus is an additional parameter to consider when developing new photoredox reactions.

== Applications ==
=== Reductive dehalogenation ===
The earliest application of photoredox catalysis to Reductive dehalogenation were limited by narrow substrate scope or competing reductive coupling.

Unactivated carbon-iodine bonds can be reduced using the strongly reducing photocatalyst tris-(2,2’-phenylpyridine)iridium (Ir(ppy)_{3}). The increased reduction potential of Ir(ppy)_{3} compared to [Ru(bipy)_{3}]^{2+} allows direct reduction of the carbon-iodine bond without interacting with a stoichiometric reductant. Thus, the iridium complex transfers an electron to the substrate, causing fragmentation of the substrate and oxidizing the catalyst to the Ir(IV) oxidation state. The oxidized photocatalyst is returned to its original oxidation state by oxidising a reaction additives.

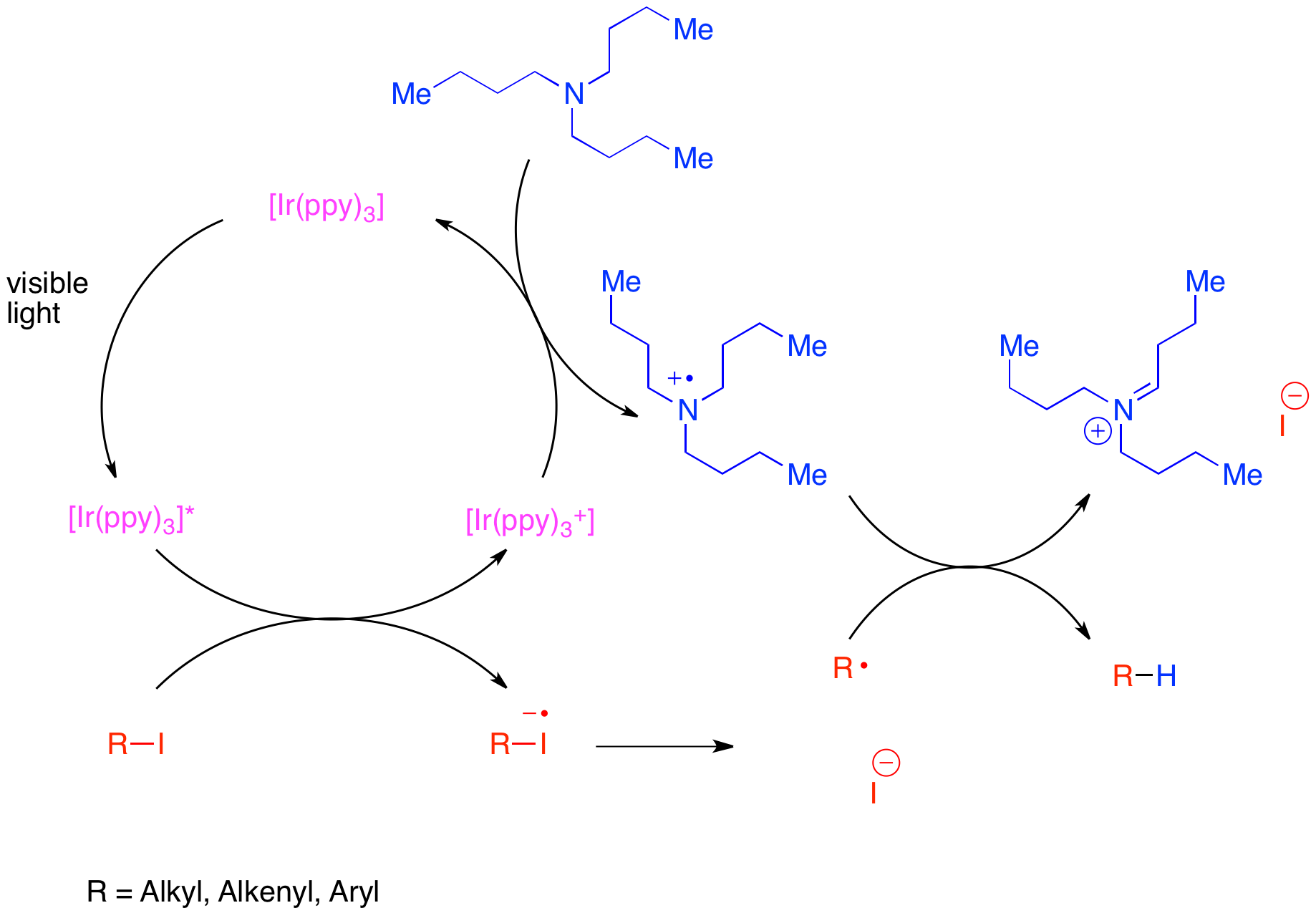
Mechanistic diagram of the reductive dehalogenation of unactivated carbon-iodine bonds

Like tin-mediated radical dehalogenation reactions, photocatalytic reductive dehalogenation can be used to initiate cascade cyclizations

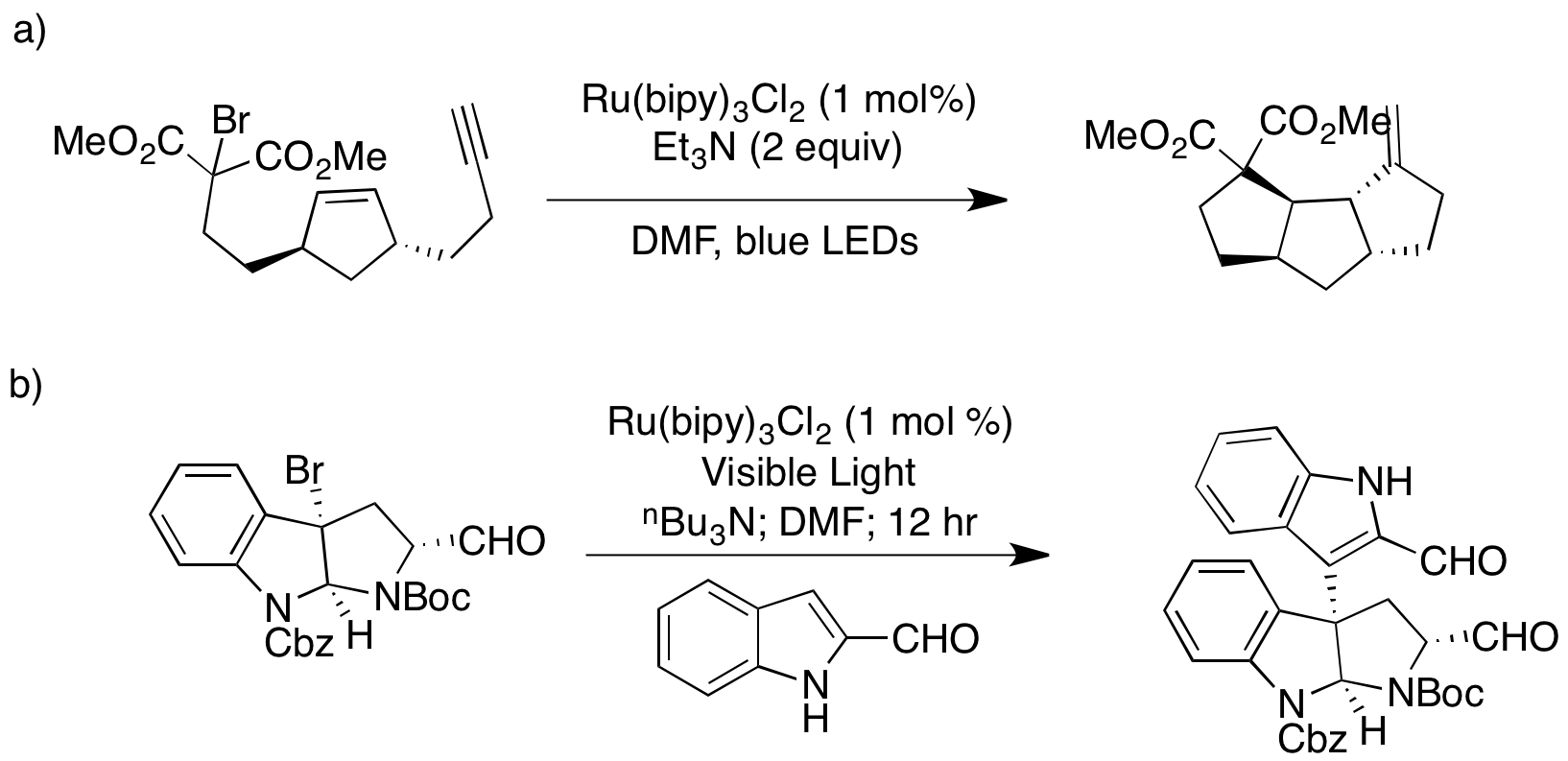
Diagram of a radical cascade cyclization initiated by a photoredox-catalyzed reductive dehalogenation reaction. b) Diagram of a radical fragment coupling initiated by a photoredox-catalyzed reductive dehalogenation reaction.

=== Oxidative generation of iminium ions ===
Iminium ions are potent electrophiles useful for generating C-C bonds in complex molecules. However, the condensation of amines with carbonyl compounds to form iminium ions is often unfavorable, sometimes requiring harsh dehydrating conditions. Thus, alternative methods for iminium ion generation, particularly by oxidation from the corresponding amine, are a valuable synthesis tool. Iminium ions can be generated from activated amines using Ir(dtbbpy)(ppy)_{2}PF_{6} as a photoredox catalyst. This transformation is proposed to occur by oxidation of the amine to the aminium radical cation by the excited photocatalyst. This is followed by hydrogen atom transfer to a superstoichimetric oxidant, such as trichloromethyl radical (CCl_{3} to form the iminium ion). The iminium ion is then quenched by reaction with a nucleophile. Related transformations of amines with a wide variety of other nucleophiles have been investigated, such as cyanide (Strecker reaction), silyl enol ethers (Mannich reaction), dialkylphosphates, allyl silanes (aza-Sakurai reaction), indoles (Friedel-Crafts reaction), and copper acetylides.

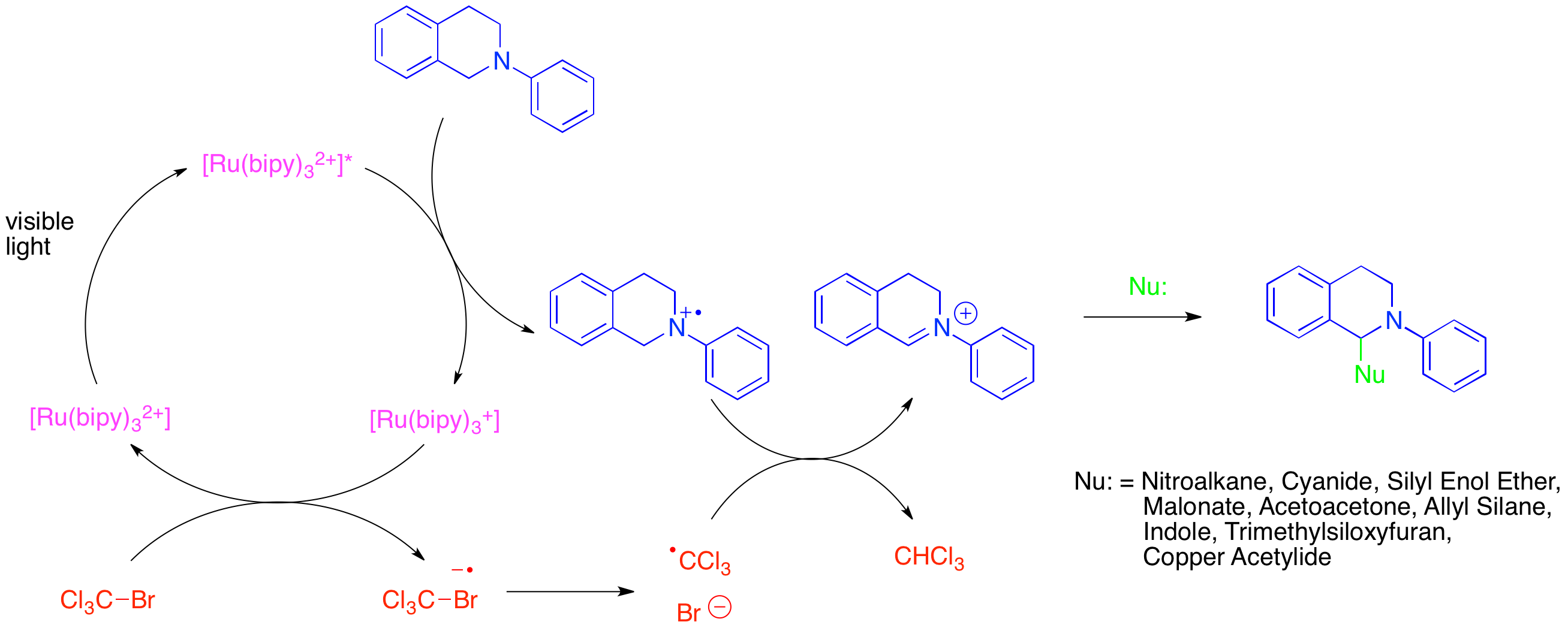
Photocatalytic generation and functionalization of iminium ions

Similar photoredox generation of iminium ions has furthermore been achieved using purely organic photoredox catalysts, such as Rose Bengal and Eosin Y.

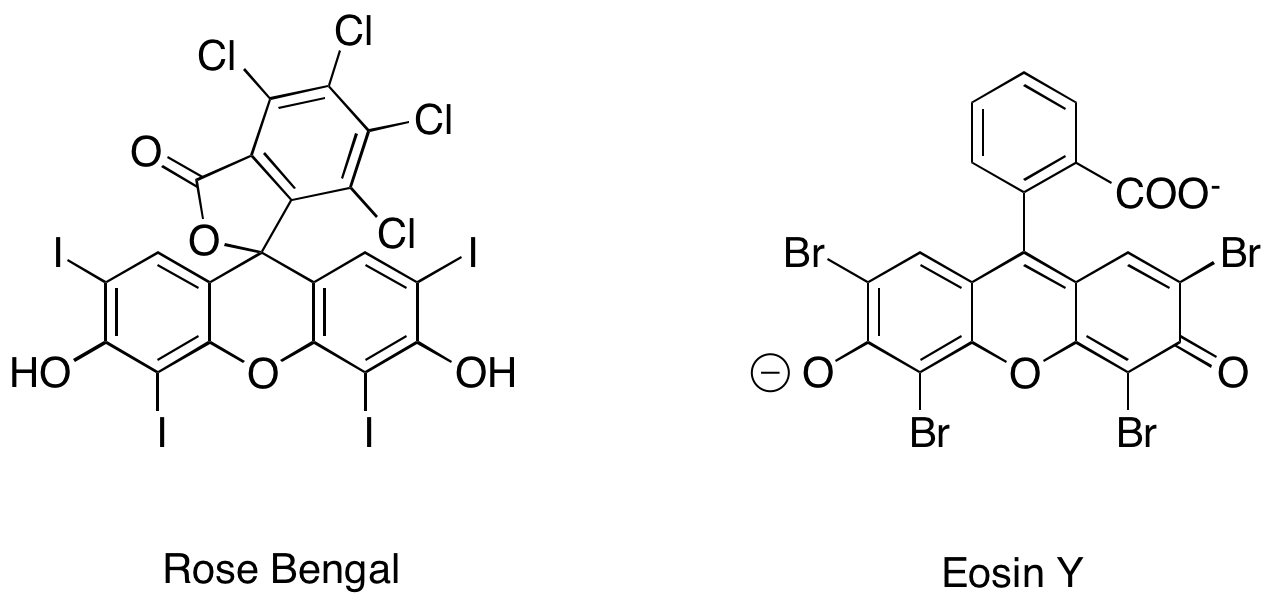
Two organic dyes used in photoredox catalysis

An asymmetric variant of this reaction utilizes acyl nucleophile equivalents generated by N-heterocyclic carbene catalysis. This reaction method sidesteps the problem of poor enantioinduction from chiral photoredox catalysts by moving the source of enantioselectivity to the N-heterocyclic carbene.

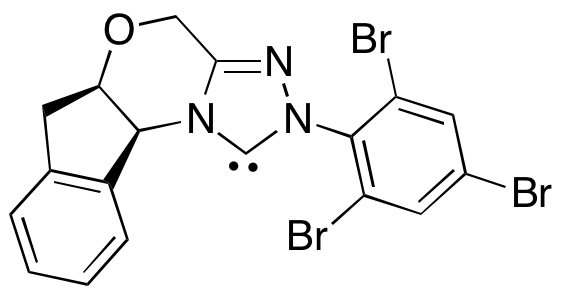
Carbene Catalyst used in alpha-acylation of amines

=== Oxidative generation of oxocarbenium ions ===
The development of orthogonal protecting groups is a problem in organic synthesis because these protecting groups allow each instance of a common functional group, such as the hydroxyl group, to be distinguished during the synthesis of a complex molecule. A very common protecting group for the hydroxyl functional group is the para-methoxy benzyl (PMB) ether. This protecting group is chemically similar to the less electron-rich benzyl ether. Typically, selective cleavage of a PMB ether in the presence of a benzyl ether uses strong stoichiometric oxidants such as 2,3-dichloro-5,6-dicyano-1,4-benzoquinone (DDQ) or ceric ammonium nitrate (CAN). PMB ethers are far more susceptible to oxidation than benzyl ethers since they are more electron-rich. The selective deprotection of PMB ethers can be achieved through the use of bis-(2-(2',4'-difluorophenyl)-5-trifluoromethylpyridine)-(4,4'-ditertbutylbipyridine)iridium(III) hexafluorophosphate (Ir[dF(CF_{3})ppy]_{2}(dtbbpy)PF_{6}) and a mild stoichiometric oxidant such as bromotrichloromethane, BrCCl_{3}. The photoexcited iridium catalyst is reducing enough to fragment the bromotrichloromethane to form a trichloromethyl radical, bromide anion, and the Ir(IV) complex. The electron-poor fluorinated ligands makes the iridium complex oxidising enough to accept an electron from an electron-rich arene such as a PMB ether. After the arene is oxidized, it will readily participate in hydrogen atom transfer with trichloromethyl radical to form chloroform and an oxocarbenium ion, which is readily hydrolyzed to reveal the free hydroxide. This reaction was demonstrated to be orthogonal to many common protecting groups when a base was added to neutralise the HBr produced.

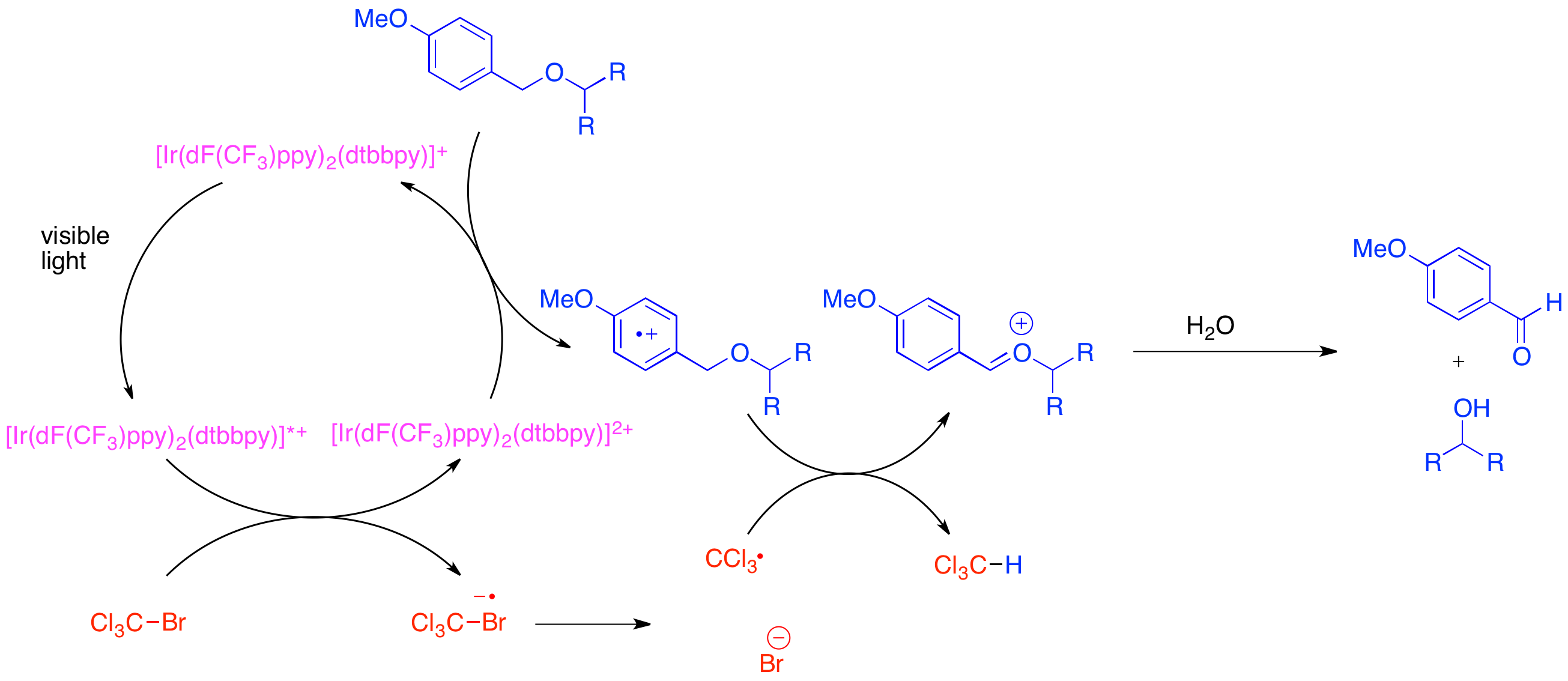
Photoredox-catalyzed PMB deprotection

=== Cycloadditions ===
Cycloadditions and other pericyclic reactions are powerful transforms in organic synthesis because of their potential to rapidly generate complex molecular architectures and particularly because of their capacity to set multiple adjacent stereocenters in a highly controlled manner. However, only certain cycloadditions are allowed under thermal conditions according to the Woodward–Hoffmann rules of orbital symmetry, or other equivalent models such as frontier molecular orbital theory (FMO) or the Dewar-Zimmermann model. Cycloadditions that are not thermally allowed, such as the [2+2] cycloaddition, can be enabled by photochemical activation of the reaction. Under uncatalyzed conditions, this activation requires the use of high energy ultraviolet light capable of altering the orbital populations of the reactive compounds. Alternatively, metal catalysts such as cobalt and copper have been reported to catalyze thermally-forbidden [2+2] cycloadditions via single electron transfer.

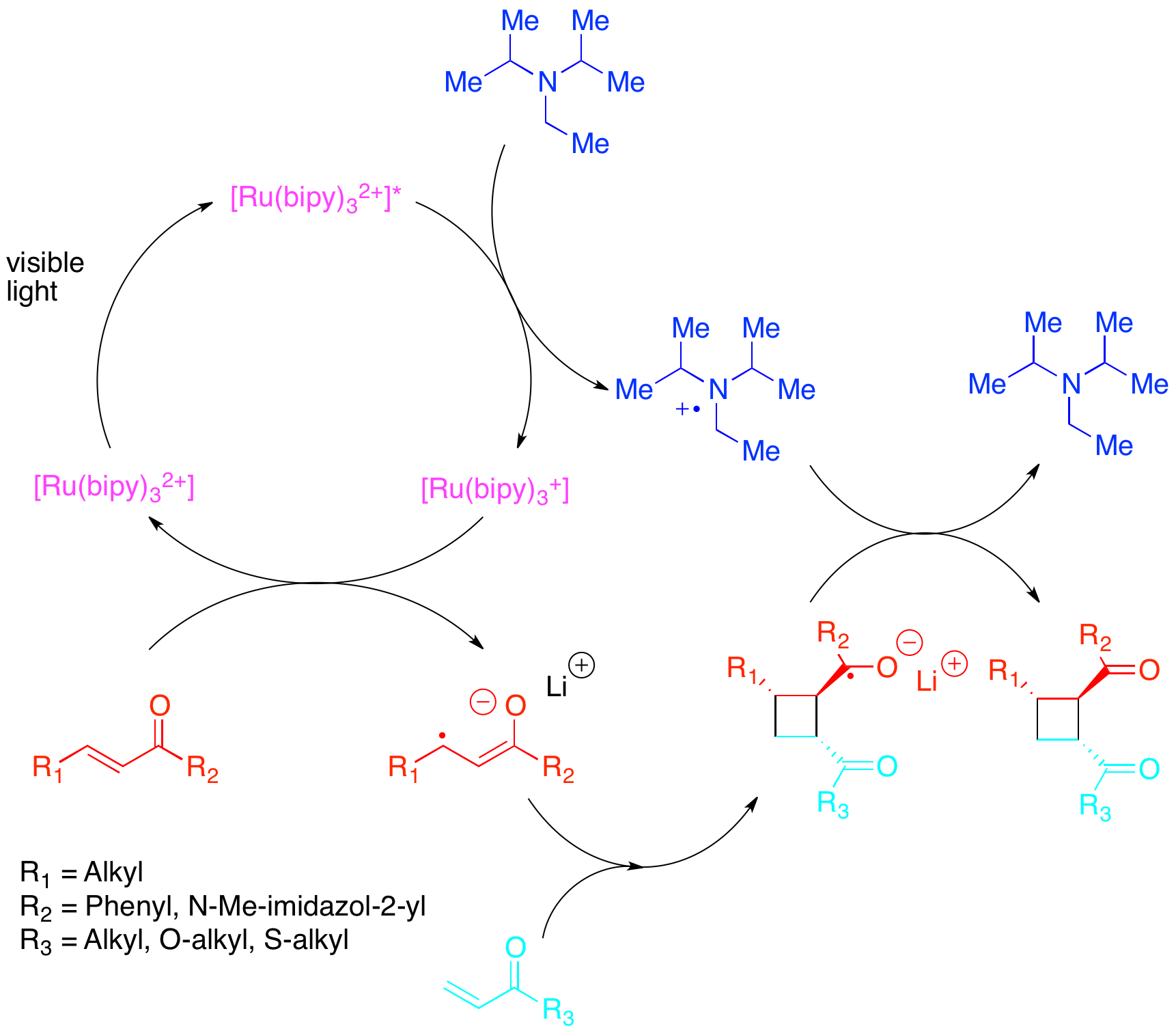
Diagram of Photocatalytic Crossed Enone 2+2 cycloaddition

The required change in orbital populations can be achieved by electron transfer with a photocatalyst sensitive to lower energy visible light. Yoon demonstrated the efficient intra- and intermolecular [2+2] cycloadditions of activated olefins: particularly enones and styrenes. Enones, or electron-poor olefins, were discovered to react via a radical-anion pathway, utilizing diisopropylethylamine as a transient source of electrons. For this electron-transfer, [Ru(bipy)_{3}]^{2+} was discovered to be an efficient photocatalyst. The anionic nature of the cyclization proved to be crucial: performing the reaction in acid rather than with a lithium counterion favored a non-cycloaddition pathway. Zhao et al. likewise discovered that a still different cyclization pathway is available to chalcones with a samarium counterion. Conversely, electron-rich styrenes were found to react via a radical-cation mechanism, utilizing methyl viologen or molecular oxygen as a transient electron sink. While [Ru(bipy)_{3}]^{2+} proved to be a competent catalyst for intramolecular cyclizations using methyl viologen, it could not be used with molecular oxygen as an electron sink or for intermolecular cyclizations. For intermolecular cyclizations, Yoon et al. discovered that the more strongly oxidizing photocatalyst [Ru(bpm)_{3}]^{2+} and molecular oxygen provided a catalytic system better suited to access the radical cation necessary for the cycloaddition to occur. [Ru(bpz)_{3}]^{2+}, a still more strongly oxidizing photocatalyst, proved to be problematic because although it could catalyze the desired [2+2] cycloaddition, it was also strong enough to oxidize the cycloadduct and catalyze the retro-[2+2] reaction. This comparison of photocatalysts highlights the importance of tuning the redox properties of a photocatalyst to the reaction system as well as demonstrating the value of polypyridyl compounds as ligands, due to the ease with which they can be modified to adjust the redox properties of their complexes.

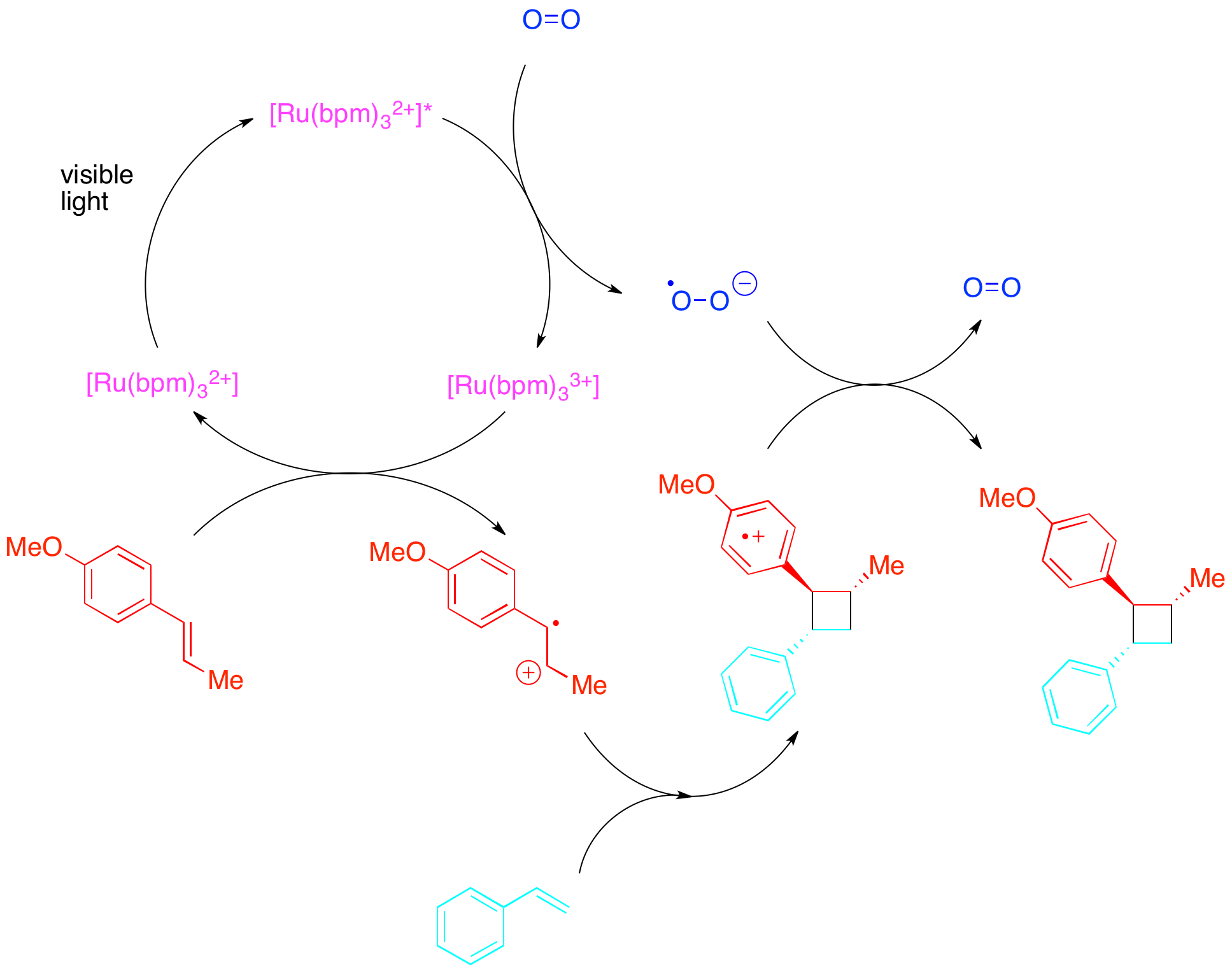
Diagram of Photocatalytic Crossed Styrene 2+2 Cycloaddition

Photoredox-catalyzed [2+2] cycloadditions can also be effected with a triphenylpyrylium organic photoredox catalyst.

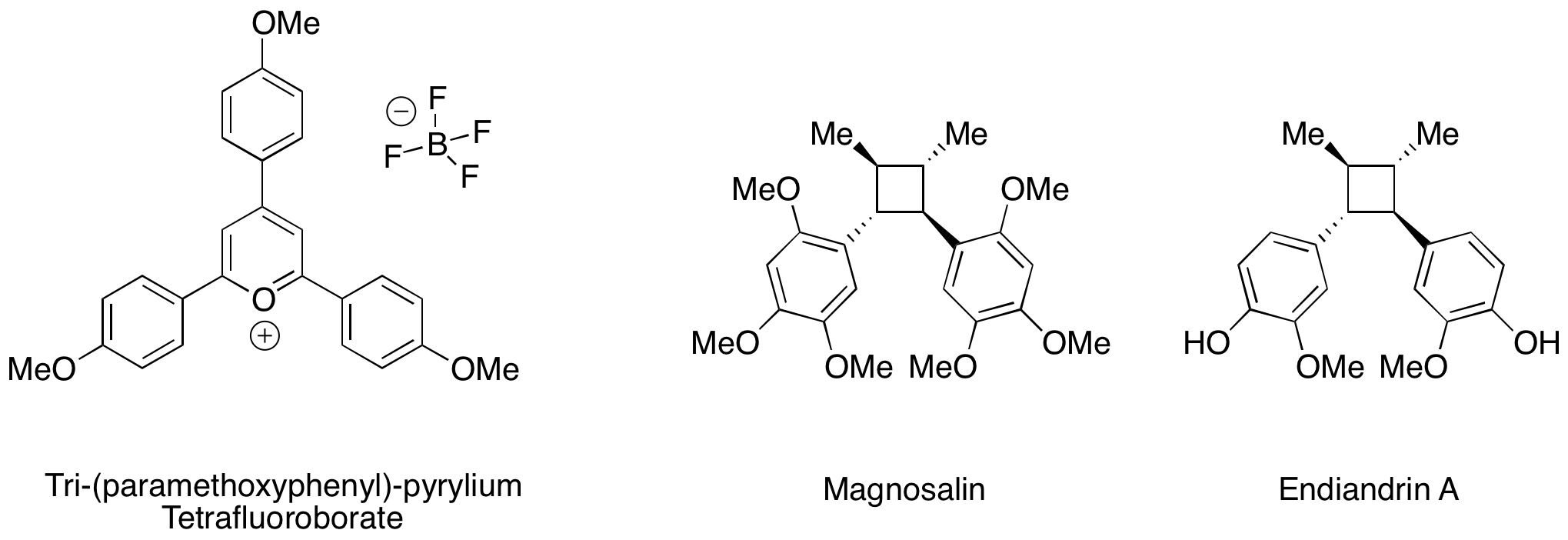
Triphenylpyrylium Photoredox catalyst

In addition to the thermally-forbidden [2+2] cycloaddition, photoredox catalysis can be applied to the [4+2] cyclization (Diels–Alder reaction). Bis-enones, similar to the substrates used for the photoredox [2+2] cyclization, but with a longer linker joining the two enone functional groups, undergo intramolecular radical-anion hetero-Diels–Alder reactions more rapidly than [2+2] cycloaddition.

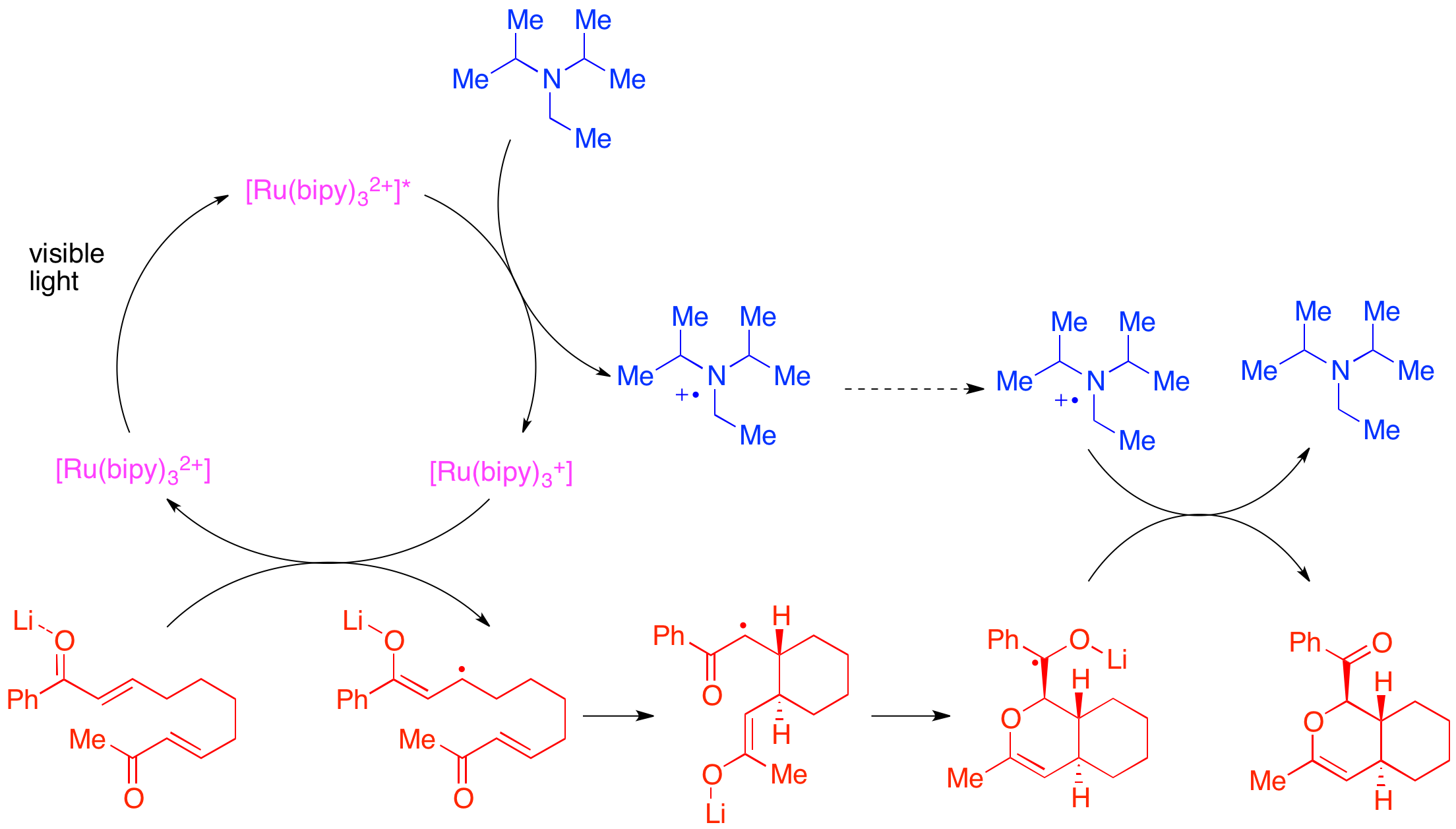
Diagram of Photocatalytic bis-enone hetero-Diels–Alder reaction

Similarly, electron-rich styrenes participate in intra- or intermolecular Diels–Alder cyclizations via a radical cation mechanism. [Ru(bipy)_{3}]^{2+} was a competent catalyst for intermolecular, but not intramolecular, Diels–Alder cyclizations. This photoredox-catalyzed Diels–Alder reaction allows cycloaddition between two electronically mismatched substrates. The normal electronic demand for the Diels–Alder reaction calls for an electron-rich diene to react with an electron-poor olefin (or "dienophile"), while the inverse electron-demand Diels–Alder reaction takes place between the opposite case of an electron-poor diene and a very electron-rich dienophile. The photoredox case, since it takes place by a different mechanism than the thermal Diels–Alder reaction, allows cycloaddition between an electron-rich diene and an electron-rich dienophile, allowing access to new classes of Diels–Alder adducts.

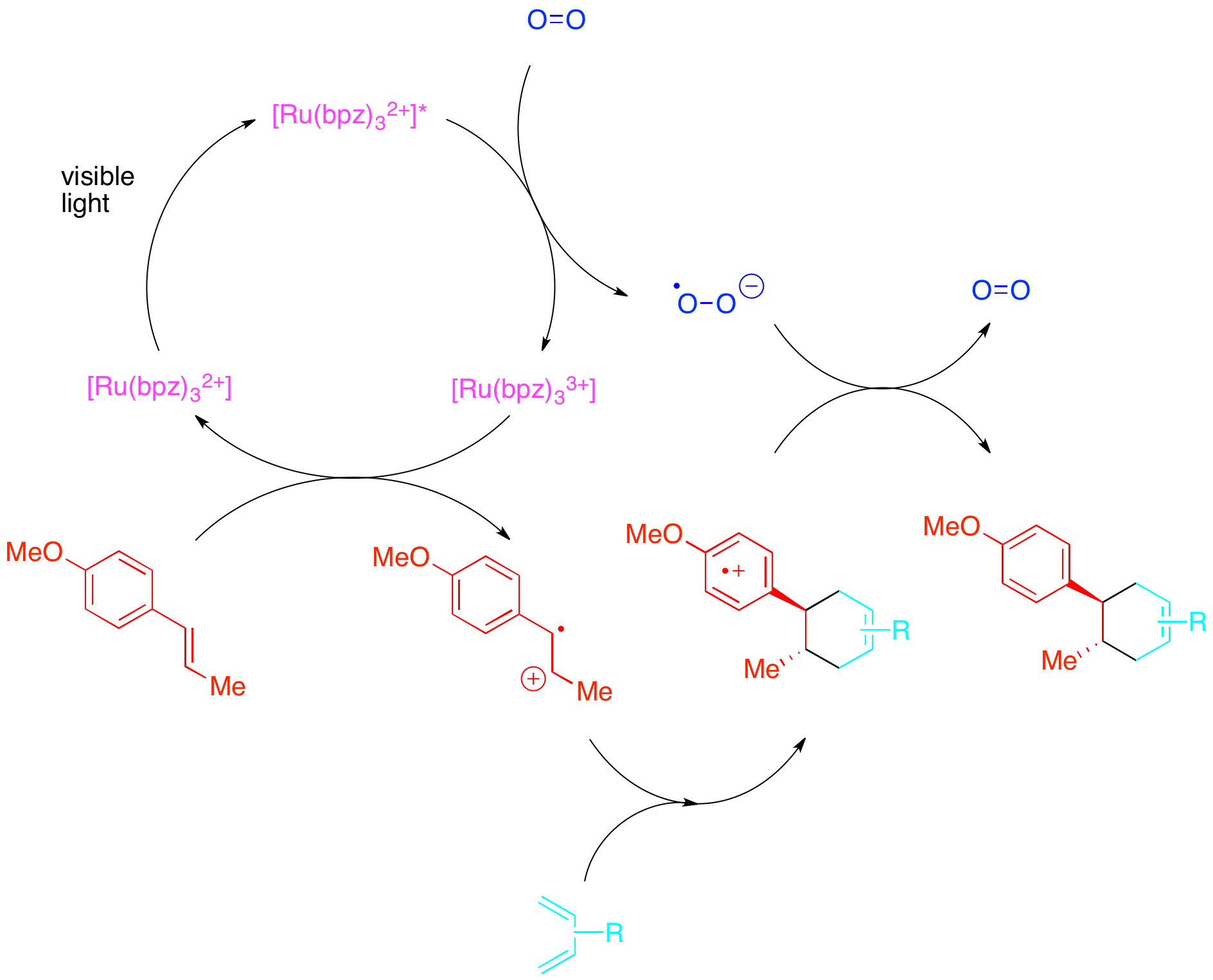
Diagram of Photocatalytic styrene Diels–Alder reaction

The synthetic value of Yoon's photoredox-catalyzed styrene Diels–Alder reaction was demonstrated via the total synthesis of the natural product Heitziamide A. This synthesis demonstrates that the thermal Diels–Alder reaction favors the undesired regioisomer, but the photoredox-catalyzed reaction gives the desired regioisomer in improved yield.

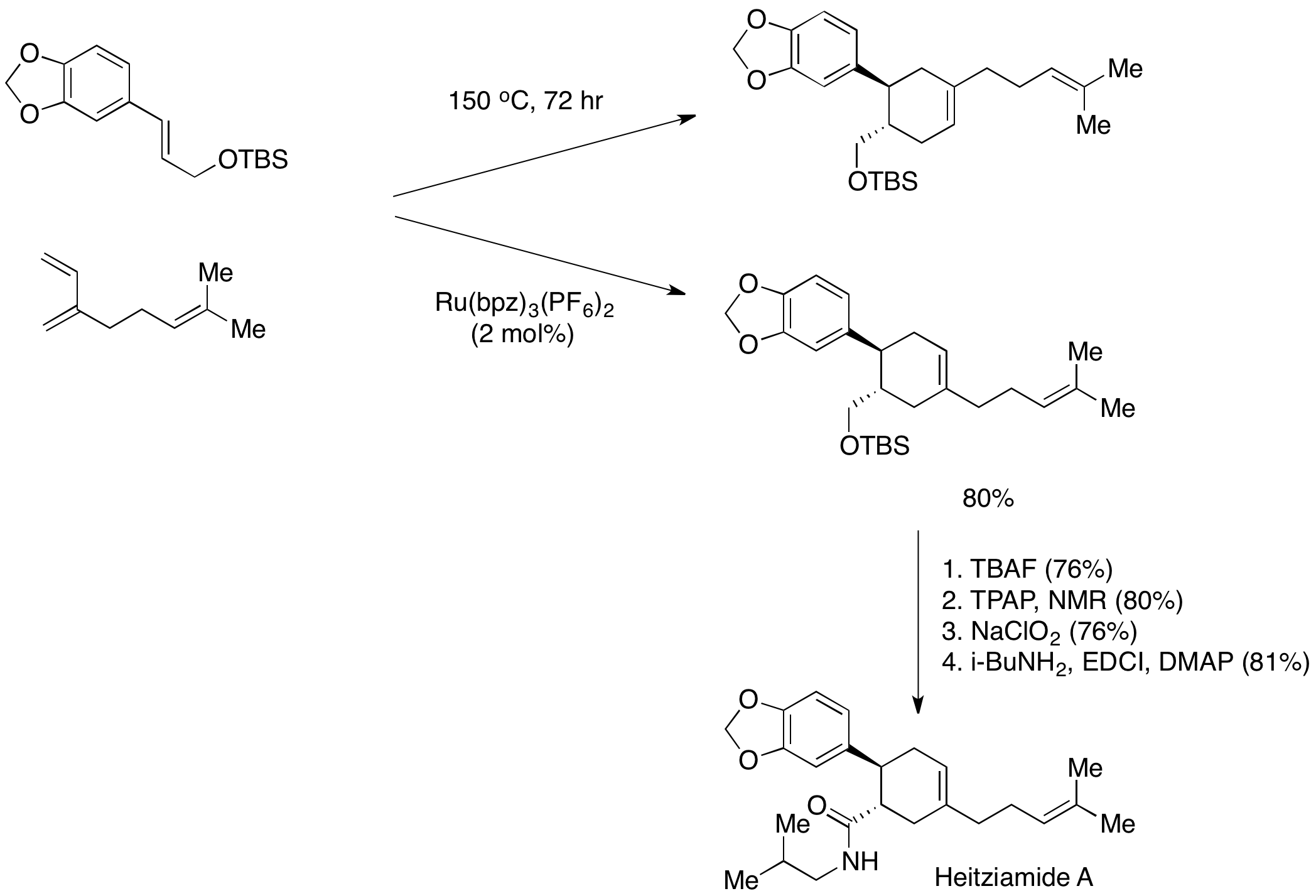
Key photoredox cycloaddition in total synthesis of Heitziamide A

=== Photoredox organocatalysis ===
Organocatalysis is a subfield of catalysis that explores the potential of organic small molecules as catalysts, particularly for the enantioselective creation of chiral molecules. One strategy in this subfield is the use of chiral secondary amines to activate carbonyl compounds. In this case, amine condensation with the carbonyl compound generates a nucleophilic enamine. The chiral amine is designed so that one face of the enamine is sterically shielded and so that only the unshielded face is free to react. Despite the power of this approach to catalyze the enantioselective functionalization of carbonyl compounds, certain valuable transformations, such as the catalytic enantioselective α-alkylation of aldehydes, remained elusive. The combination of organocatalysis and photoredox methods provides a catalytic solution to this problem. In this approach for the α-alkylation of aldehydes, [Ru(bipy)_{3}]^{2+} reductively fragments an activated alkyl halide, such as bromomalonate or phenacyl bromide, which can then add to catalytically-generated enamine in an enantioselective manner. The oxidized photocatalyst then oxidatively quenches the resulting α-amino radical to form an iminium ion, which hydrolyzes to give the functionalized carbonyl compound. This photoredox transformation was shown to be mechanistically distinct from another organocatalytic radical process termed singly-occupied molecular orbital (SOMO) catalysis. SOMO catalysis employs superstoichiometric ceric ammonium nitrate (CAN) to oxidize the catalytically-generated enamine to the corresponding radical cation, which can then add to a suitable coupling partner such as allyl silane. This type of mechanism is excluded for the photocatalytic alkylation reaction because whereas enamine radical cation was observed to cyclize onto pendant olefins and open cyclopropane radical clocks in SOMO catalysis, these structures were unreactive in the photoredox reaction.

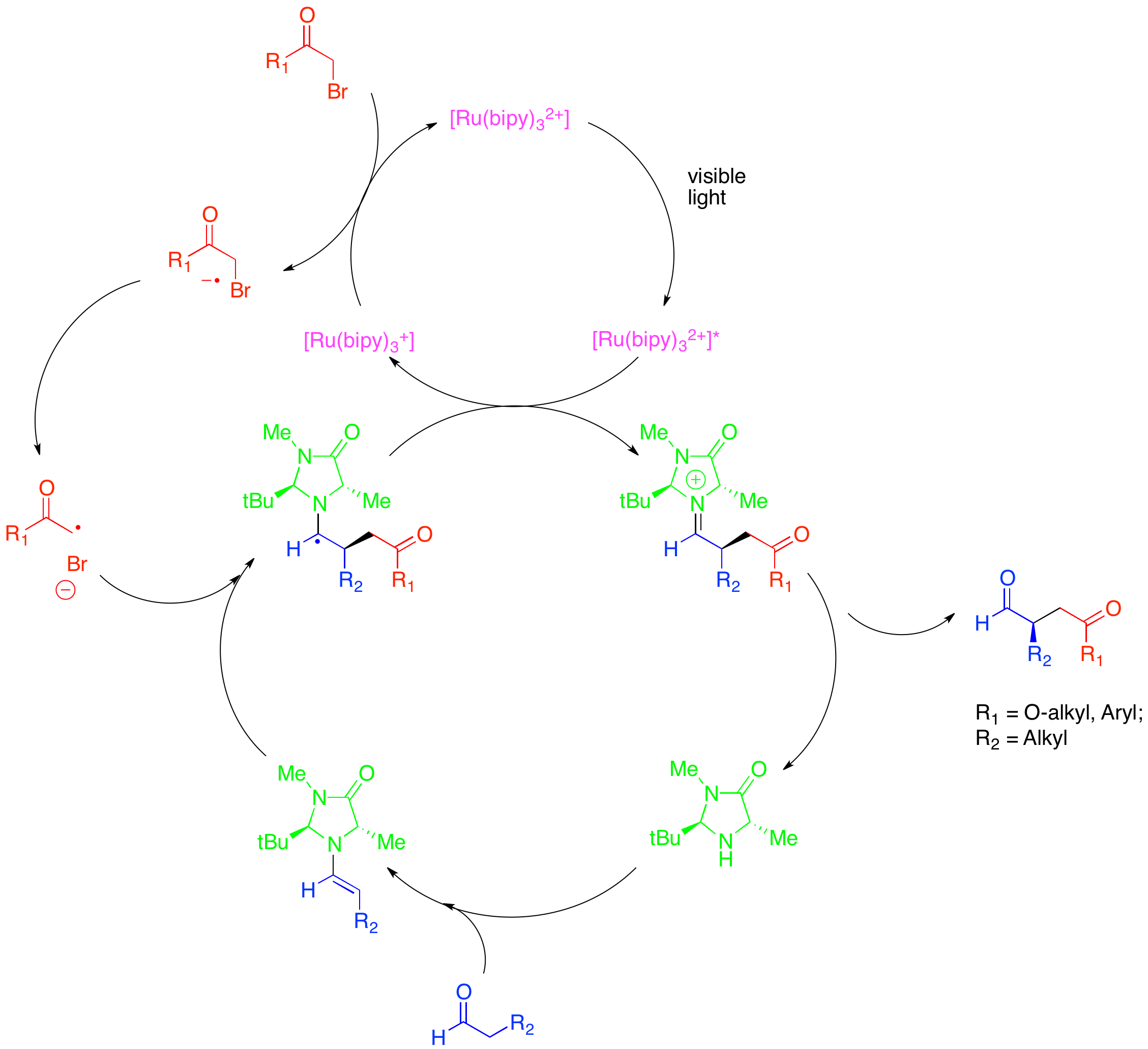
Diagram of Enantioselective Alkylation of Aldehydes via the synergistic combination of organo- and photoredox catalysis

This transformation include alkylations with other classes of activated alkyl halides of synthetic interest. In particular, the use of the photocatalyst Ir(dtbbpy)(ppy)_{2}^{+} allows the enantioselective α-trifluoromethylation of aldehydes while the use of Ir(ppy)_{3} allowed the enantioselective coupling of aldehydes with electron-poor benzylic bromides. Zeitler et al. also investigated the productive merger of photoredox and organocatalytic methods to achieve enantioselective alkylation of aldehydes. The same chiral imidazolidinone organocatalyst was used to form enamine and introduce chirality. However, the organic photoredox catalyst Eosin Y was used rather than a ruthenium or iridium complex.

Direct β-arylation of saturated aldehydes and ketones can be effected through the combination of photoredox and organocatalytic methods. The previous method to accomplish direct β-functionalization of a saturated carbonyl consists of a one-pot consists of a two-step process, both catalyzed by a secondary amine organocatalyst: stoichiometric reduction of an aldehyde with IBX followed by addition of an activated alkyl nucleophile to the beta-position of the resulting enal. This transformation, which like other photoredox processes takes place by a radical mechanism, is limited to the addition of highly electrophilic arenes to the beta position. The severe limitations on the arene component scope in this reaction is due primarily to the need for an arene radical anion that is stable enough not to react directly with enamine or enamine radical cation. In the proposed mechanism, the activated photoredox catalyst is quenched oxidatively by an electron-deficient arene, such as 1,4-dicyanobenzene. The photocatalyst then oxidizes an enamine species, transiently generated by the condensation of an aldehyde with a secondary amine cocatalyst, such as the optimal isopropyl benzylamine. The resulting enamine radical cation usually reacts as a 3 π-electron system, but due to the stability of the radical coupling partners, deprotonation of the β-methylene position gives rise to a 5 π-electron system with strong radical character at the newly accessed β-carbon. Although this reaction relies on the use of a secondary amine organocatalyst to generate the enamine species which is oxidized in the proposed mechanism, no enantioselective variant of this reaction exists.

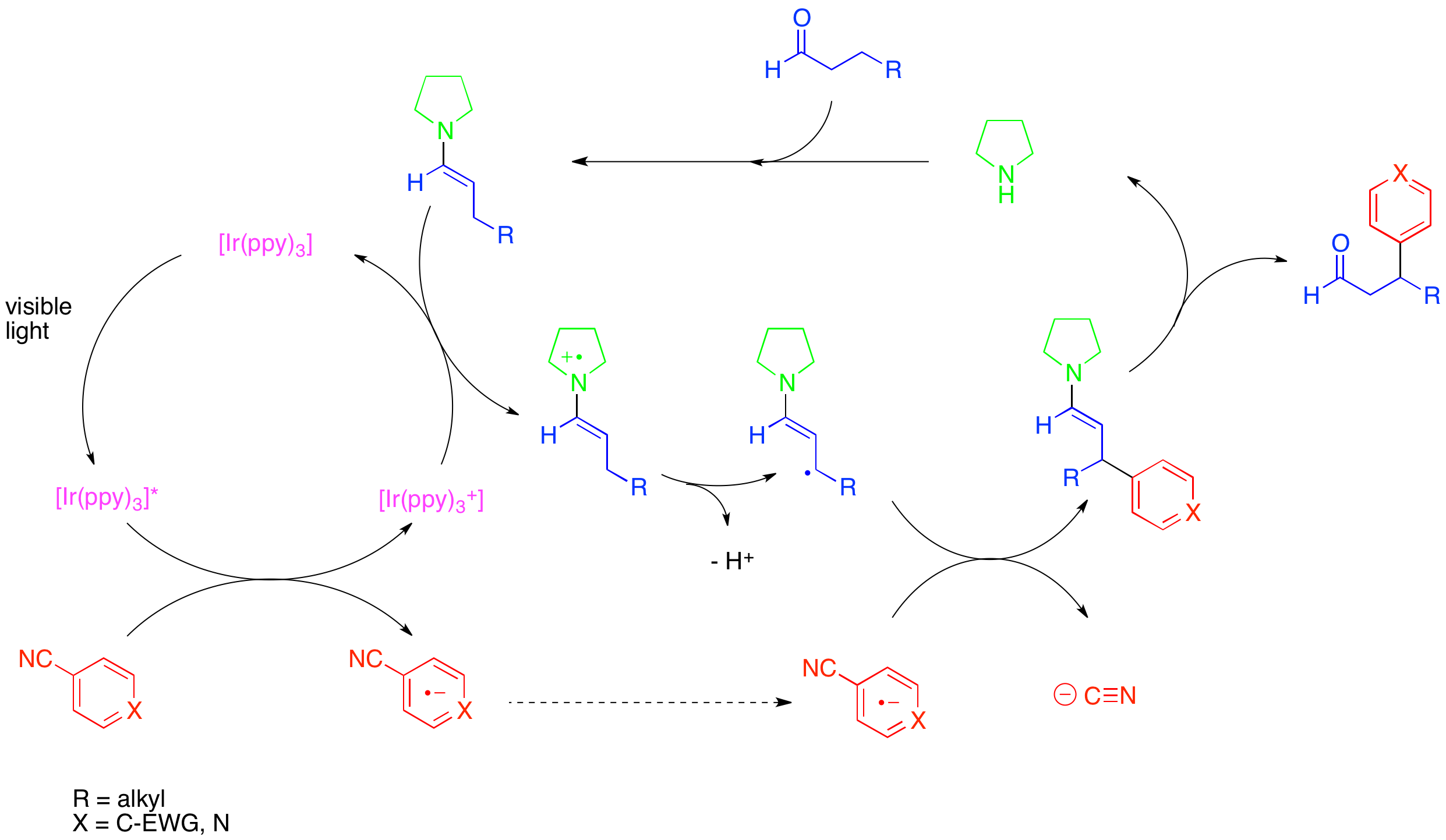
Diagram of Photoredox beta-arylation of aldehydes

The development of this direct β-arylation of aldehydes led to related reactions for the β-functionalization of cyclic ketones. In particular, β-arylation of cyclic ketones has been achieved under similar reaction conditions, but using azepane as the secondary amine cocatalyst. A photocatalytic "homo-aldol" reaction works for cyclic ketones, allowing the coupling of the beta-position of the ketone to the ipso carbon of aryl ketones, such as benzophenone and acetophenone. In addition to the azepane cocatalyst, this reaction requires the use of the more strongly reducing photoredox catalyst Ir(ppy)_{3} and the addition of lithium hexafluoroarsenide (LiAsF_{6}) to promote single-electron reduction of the aryl ketone.

=== Additions to olefins ===
The use of photoredox catalysis to generate reactive heteroatom-centered radicals was first explored in the 1990s. [Ru(bipy)_{3}]^{2+} was found to catalyze the fragmentation of tosylphenylselenide to phenylselenolate anion and tosyl radical and that a radical chain propagation mechanism allowed the addition of tosyl radical and phenylseleno- radical across the double bond of electron rich alkyl vinyl ethers. Since phenylselenolate anion is readily oxidized to diphenyldiselenide, the low quantities of diphenyldiselenide observed was taken as an indication that photoredox-catalyzed fragmentation of tosylphenylselenide was only important as an initiation step, and that most of the reactivity was due to a radical chain process.

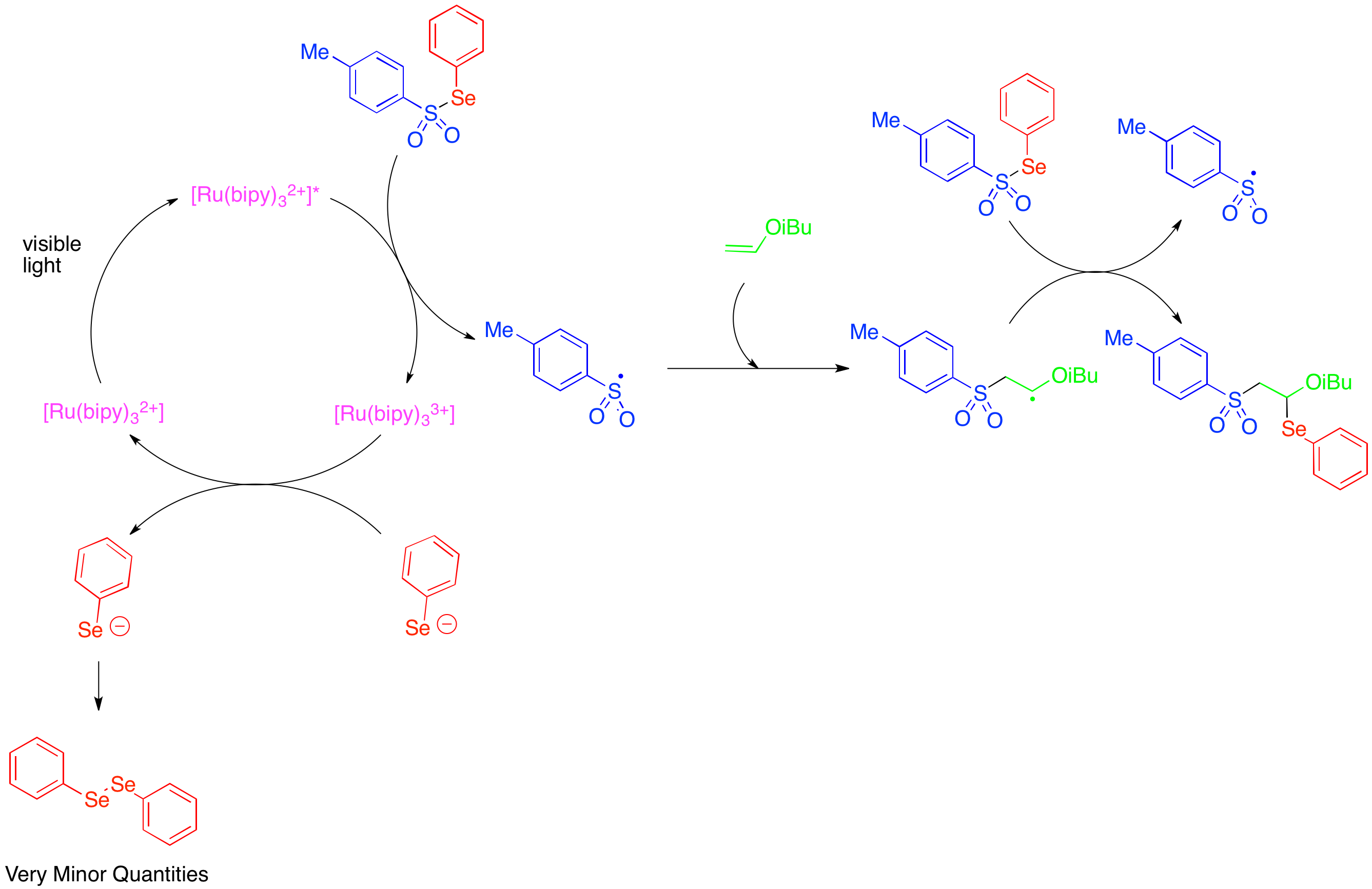
Addition of Tosylphenylselenide across an olefin

Heteroaromatic additions to olefins include multicomponent oxy- and aminotrifluoromethylation reactions. These reactions use Umemoto's reagent, a sulfonium salt that serves as an electrophilic source of the trifluoromethyl group and that is precedented to react via a single-electron transfer pathway. Thus, single-electron reduction of Umemoto's reagent releases trifluoromethyl radical, which adds to the reactive olefin. Subsequently, single-electron oxidation of the alkyl radical generated by this addition produces a cation which can be trapped by water, an alcohol, or a nitrile. In order to achieve high levels of regioselectivity, this reactivity has been explored mainly for styrenes, which are biased towards formation of the benzylic radical intermediate.

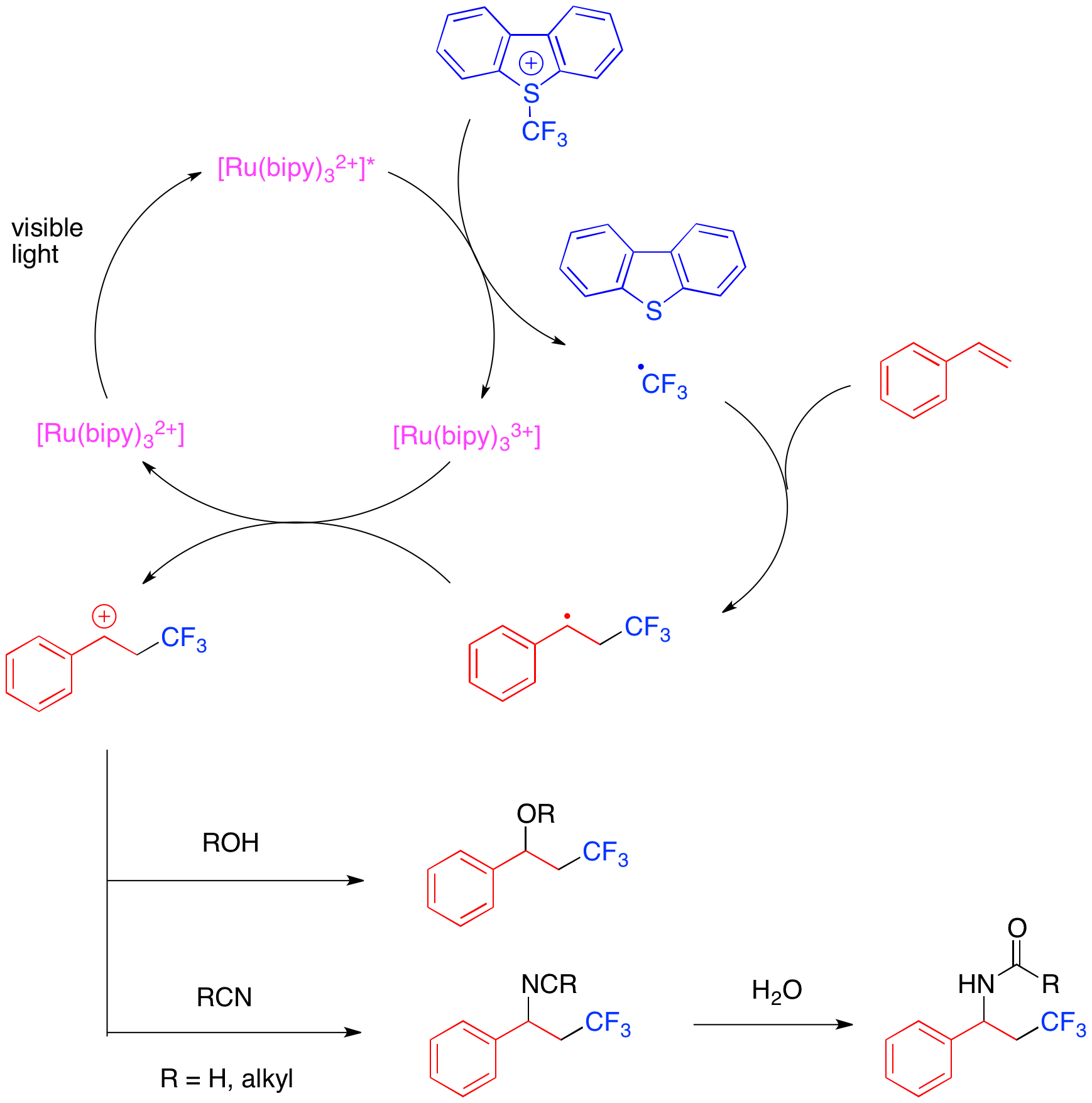
Photoredox-catalyzed oxy- and aminotrifluoromethylation

Hydrotrifluoromethylation of styrenes and aliphatic alkenes can be effected with a mesityl acridinium organic photoredox catalyst and Langlois' reagent as the source of CF_{3} radical. In this reaction, it was found that trifluoroethanol and substoichiometric amounts of an aromatic thiol, such as methyl thiosalicylate, employed in tandem served as the best source of hydrogen radical to complete the catalytic cycle.

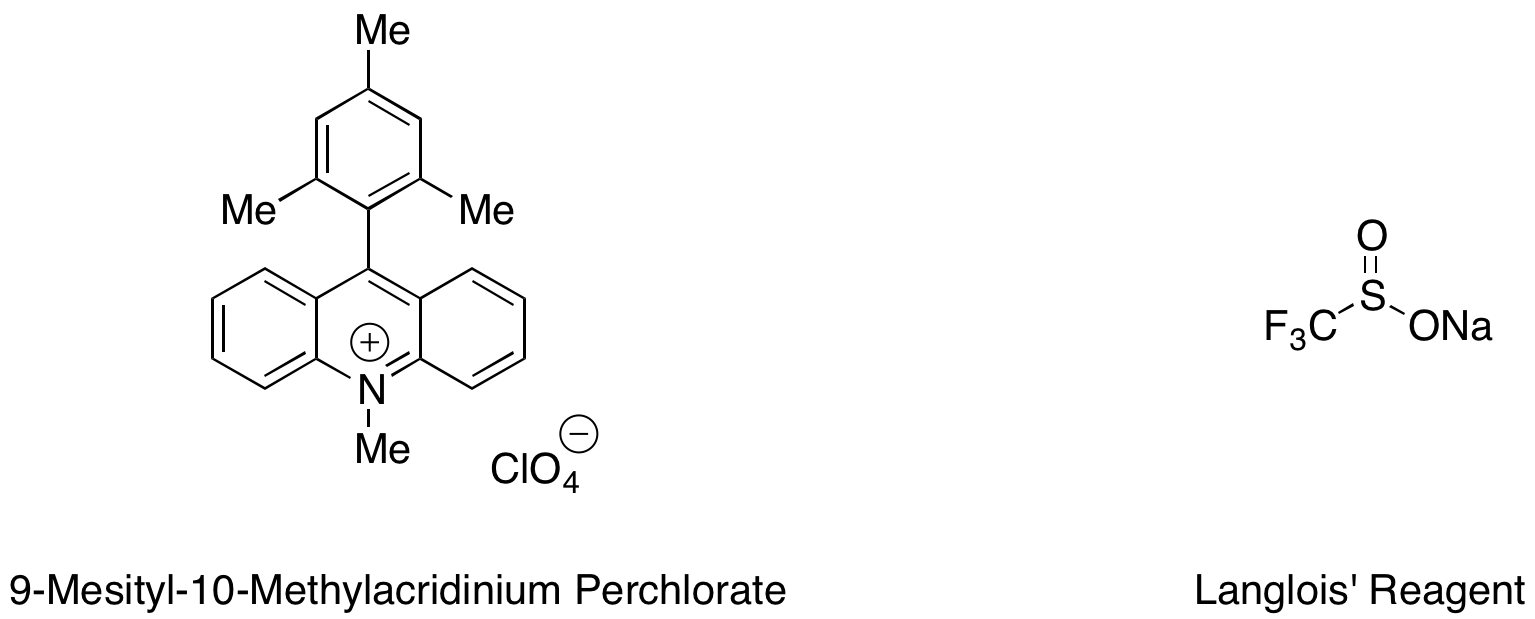
Diagram of two reagents for olefin hydrotrifluoromethylation

Intramolecular hydroetherifications and hydroaminations proceed with anti-Markovnikov selectivity. One mechanism invokes the single-electron oxidation of the olefin, trapping the radical cation by a pendant hydroxyl or amine functional group, and quenching the resulting alkyl radical by H-atom transfer from a highly labile donor species. Extensions of this reactivity to intermolecular systems have resulted in i) a new synthetic route to complex tetrahydrofurans by a "polar-radical-crossover cycloaddition" (PRCC reaction) of an allylic alcohol with an olefin, and ii) the anti-Markovnikov addition of carboxylic acids to olefins.

=== Sulfoximidation ===
Sulfoximidation of electron-rich arenes is enabled by photoredox catalysis.

== See also ==
- Photosensitizer
