= Tris(2-phenylpyridine)iridium =

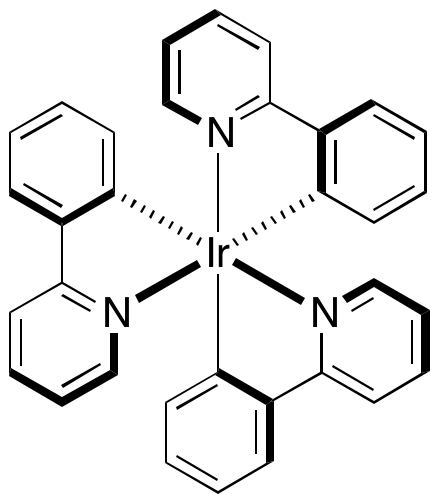

Names
- Other names tris(2-phenylpyridine)iridium, Tris[2-(2-pyridinyl)phenyl]iridium, Tris[2-(2-pyridinyl)phenyl-C,N]iridium

Identifiers
CAS Number	94928-86-6
ChemSpider	19285809
ECHA InfoCard	100.163.509
PubChem CID	45358635 (formula wrong)
CompTox Dashboard (EPA)	DTXSID10464270
- InChI: InChI=1S/3C11H8N.Ir/c3*1-2-6-10(7-3-1)11-8-4-5-9-12-11;/h3*1-6,8-9H; Key: QKBWDYLFYVXTGE-UHFFFAOYSA-N

Properties
Chemical formula	C_{33}H_{24}IrN_{3}
Molar mass	654.793 g·mol^{−1}
Appearance	yellow-green solid

Hazards
- GHS labelling
Pictograms	(GHS07: Exclamation mark)
Signal word	Warning
Hazard statements	H315, H319, H335
Precautionary statements	P261, P264, P271, P280, P302+P352, P304+P340, P305+P351+P338, P312, P321, P332+P313, P337+P313, P362, P403+P233, P405, P501
- Except where otherwise noted, data are given for materials in their standard state (at 25 °C [77 °F], 100 kPa). Infobox references

Tris(2-phenylpyridine)iridium, abbreviated [Ir(ppy)_{3}] is the organoiridium complex with the formula Ir(C_{6}H_{4}-C_{5}H_{4}N)_{3}. The complex, a yellow-green solid, is a derivative of Ir^{3+} bound to three monoanionic 2-pyridinylphenyl ligands. It is electroluminescent, emitting green light. The complex is observed with the facial stereochemistry, which is chiral.

The complex is prepared by cyclometalation reactions of 2-phenylpyridine and iridium trichloride, as represented by this idealized equation:

IrCl_{3} + 3 C_{6}H_{5}-C_{5}H_{4}N → Ir(C_{6}H_{4}-C_{5}H_{4}N)_{3} + 3 HCl

The complex and many analogues have been investigated for application in photoredox catalysis. Its excited state has an oxidative potential of −2.14 V, nearly 1 V more negative than the oxidative potential of excited [Ru(bipy)_{3}]^{2+}.
