= Phosphoramidite ligand =

A phosphoramidite ligand is any phosphorus-based ligand with the general formula P(OR^{1})(OR^{2})(NRR'). Chiral versions of these ligands, particularly those derived from the BINOL scaffold, are widely used in enantioselective synthesis. The application of phosphoramidites as effective monodentate ligands for transition metal catalysis was first reported by Dutch chemist Ben Feringa. The introduction of phosphoramidite ligands challenged the notion that high flexibility in the metal–ligand complex is detrimental for high stereocontrol.

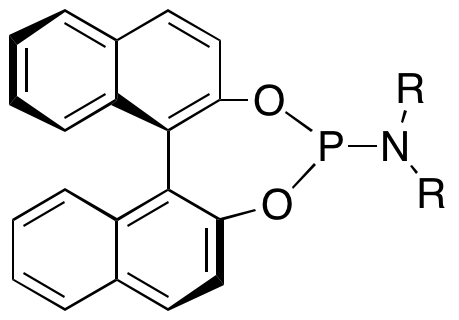
General Structure of Phosphoramidite Ligand

== History ==
In 1996 Feringa et al., reported an enantioselective 1,4-addition of aliphatic zinc reagents to enones catalyzed by copper in the presence of BINOL derived phosphoramidite ligands. The high levels of enantioselectivity achieved with these ligands opened the door for numerous other asymmetric transformations, which previously relied on bidentate phosphine ligands. This paradigm shift using monodentate phosphine ligands challenged the belief that a tight metal-ligand complex is necessary for high stereocontrol. Then in 2000, Reetz, Pringle, and Feringa and de Vries each autonomously described the use of phosphoramidite ligands for asymmetric hydrogenation. High enantioselectivities were reached, rivaling those using the most selective bidentate ligands known. Various chiral commodities could be obtained via this synthetic method including, amino acids, diacids and esters, cinnamic acids, amines, as well as heterocycles.

== Synthesis of phosphoramidite ligands ==
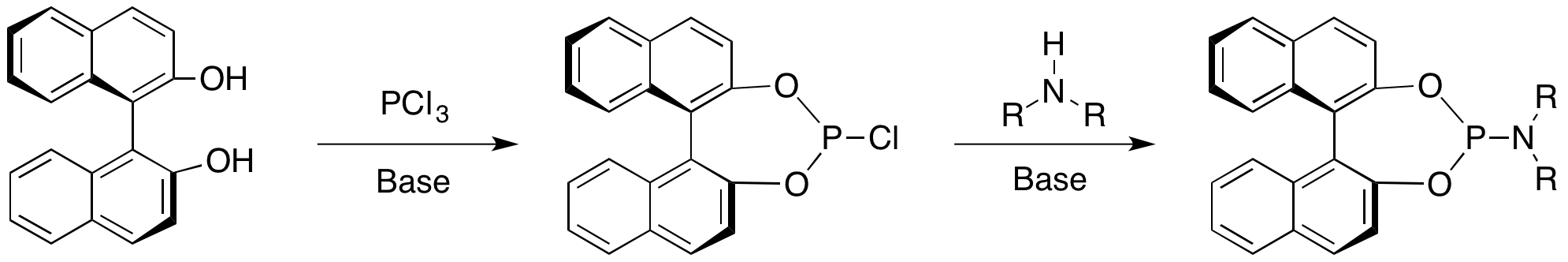
Synthesis of Phosphoramidite Ligand

Phosphoramidite ligands bearing the BINOL backbone (Figure 2.) are prepared via the chlorophosphite. The two hydroxyl groups of BINOL are treated first with phosphorus trichloride and subsequently the desired amine (HNR_{2}) is added in the presence of a base.

== Reactions using phosphoramidite ligands ==
=== As reagent in asymmetric catalysis ===
Recently, Mondal et al. developed a general strategy for the preparation of chiral phosphorus compounds that have a stereocentre at the phosphorus atom, so-called P-chirogenic phosphorus compounds. Specifically, the authors used readily accessible and cheap, axially chiral 1,1′-bi-2-naphthol (BINOL)-based phosphoramidites and aryl halides or triflates as starting materials, and Pd-catalysed cross-coupling for asymmetric C–P bond formation. Key to the success of their approach is the axial-to-central transfer of chirality from the BINOL structure to the phosphorus atom during the catalytic cross-coupling event. They discovered that the C–P bond formation shows high chemoselectivity with a variety of aryl halides and excellent stereocontrol in the formation of the new phosphorus stereocentre, which is attributed to the fixed stereochemistry of the BINOL unit. Importantly, they found that a range of P-chirogenic phosphorus compounds and their derivatives can be synthesized as virtually single enantiomers. Pure enantiomers are essential, for instance, as chiral ligands, and for drug discovery. This catalytic asymmetric C–P coupling methodology allows the formation of a variety of structures with a high tolerance of different functional groups in the products. The flexibility of the method is demonstrated by the fact that distinct stereoisomers of chiral phosphorus compounds can be formed by simply changing the order of steps in the synthetic sequence. This strategy also gives easy access to this route provides a variety of homochiral phosphines and opens up many avenues for metal-catalyzed asymmetric transformations. The majority of chiral phosphines currently used as ligands in asymmetric metal-catalysed transformations are axial-chiral, planar-chiral or C-stereogenic phosphines. Now, by applying the methodology Feringa et al. have developed, the unique stereochemistry of P-chirogenic ligands can be readily explored.

=== 1,4-addition ===
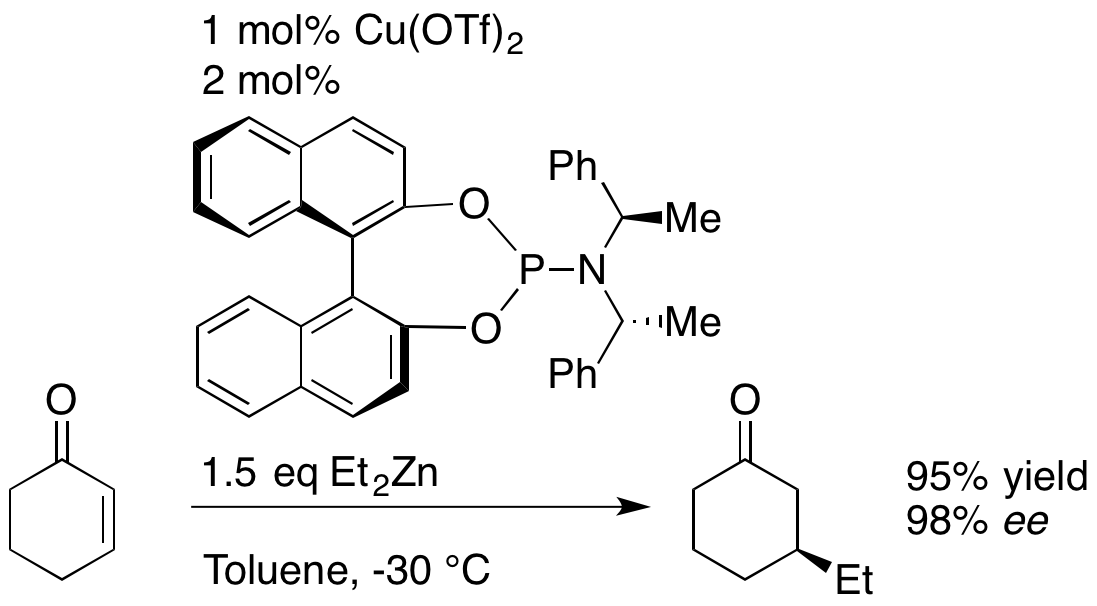
Reactions of phosphoramidite ligand

A dramatic increase in the enantioselectivity of the addition reactions was observed when a chiral amine moiety was incorporated in these phosphoramidite ligands. Excellent yields (up to 95%) and ee values exceeding 98% ee were achieved in the addition to cyclochexenone in the presence of the bis(1-phenylethyl)amine derived ligand. In addition to the organozinc nucleophiles used by Feringa, the 1,4-addition to enones has been shown by Woodward to work with organoaluminum nucleophiles.

=== Rhodium-Catalyzed Hydrogenation ===
Phosphoramidite ligands also find use in asymmetric hydrogenation reactions. The ligands for this transformation require generating a chiral center on the amine portion of the ligand. These ligands afford a very active and productive catalyst, which efficiently reduces a various acetamides. It is worth noting that the ligand shown (Figure 4.) is the only ligand known to afford greater than 90% enantioselectivity for the substrate shown.

=== Asymmetric Regioselective Allylic Aminations ===
Hartwig and co-workers have succeeded in developing highly selective iridium catalysts with (R,R,R)-phosphoramidite L The allylic aminations of a wide variety of achiral allylic esters proceeded with total conversion and superb regioselectivity in many cases. The reaction shown clearly illustrates the power of this methodology, wherein cinnamyl acetate was converted to the allylic benzyl amine in excellent yield and enantiopurity . The authors mentioned that these valuable amination reactions were mediated by air-stable Ir complexes at ambient temperatures, which should lead to wide acceptance of this catalyst in bench-top organic synthesis.
