= 2-Phenylpyridine =

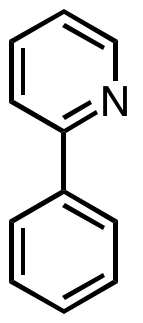

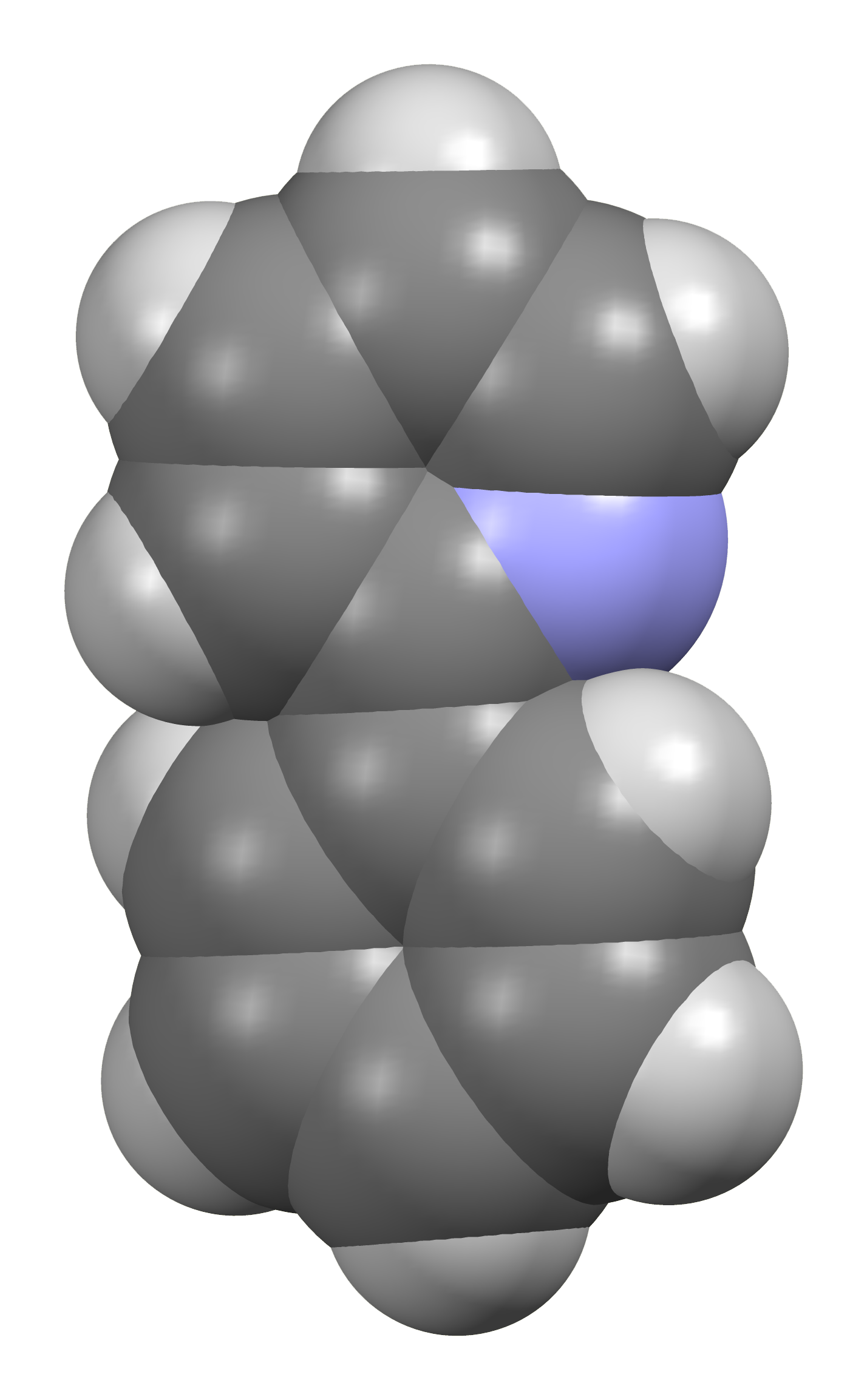

Names
- Preferred IUPAC name 2-Phenylpyridine
- Other names 2-Azabiphenyl

Identifiers
CAS Number	1008-89-5
3D model (JSmol)	Interactive image
ChemSpider	13286
ECHA InfoCard	100.012.512
EC Number	213-763-1
MeSH	C058324
PubChem CID	13887
UNII	2Y6S09838Q
CompTox Dashboard (EPA)	DTXSID6074417
- InChI: InChI=1S/C11H9N/c1-2-6-10(7-3-1)11-8-4-5-9-12-11/h1-9H Key: VQGHOUODWALEFC-UHFFFAOYSA-N; InChI=1/C11H9N/c1-2-6-10(7-3-1)11-8-4-5-9-12-11/h1-9H Key: VQGHOUODWALEFC-UHFFFAOYAS
- SMILES: c1ccc(cc1)c2ccccn2

Properties
Chemical formula	C_{11}H_{9}N
Molar mass	155.200 g·mol^{−1}
Appearance	Colorless oil
Density	1.086 g/mL
Boiling point	268–270 °C (514–518 °F; 541–543 K)
Solubility in water	Low
- Except where otherwise noted, data are given for materials in their standard state (at 25 °C [77 °F], 100 kPa). Infobox references

2-Phenylpyridine is an organic compound with the formula C_{6}H_{5}C_{5}H_{4}N (or C_{11}H_{9}N). It is a colourless viscous liquid. The compound and related derivatives have attracted interest as precursors to highly fluorescent metal complexes of possible value as organic light emitting diodes (OLEDs).

The compound is prepared by the reaction of phenyl lithium with pyridine:

C_{6}H_{5}Li + C_{5}H_{5}N → C_{6}H_{5}-C_{5}H_{4}N + LiH

The reaction of iridium trichloride with 2-phenylpyridine proceeds via cyclometallation to give the chloride-bridged complex:

4 C_{6}H_{5}-C_{5}H_{4}N + 2 IrCl_{3}(H_{2}O)_{3} → Ir_{2}Cl_{2}(C_{6}H_{4}-C_{5}H_{4}N)_{4} + 4 HCl

This complex can be converted to the pictured tris(cyclometallated) derivative tris(2-phenylpyridine)iridium.

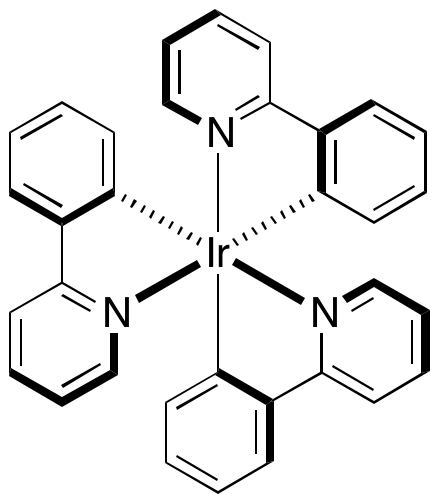
Structure of Ir(C_{6}H_{4}-C_{5}H_{4}N)_{3}

The degree and regiochemistry of fluorination of metalated 2-phenylpyridine ligands in platinum(II) complexes significantly modifies the emission properties of the complexes.
