= Opheline kinase =

Identifiers
- EC no.: 2.7.3.7
- CAS no.: 37278-15-2

Databases
- IntEnz: IntEnz view
- BRENDA: BRENDA entry
- ExPASy: NiceZyme view
- KEGG: KEGG entry
- MetaCyc: metabolic pathway
- PRIAM: profile
- PDB structures: RCSB PDB PDBe PDBsum
- Gene Ontology: AmiGO / QuickGO
Search
- PMC: articles
- PubMed: articles
- NCBI: proteins

Opheline kinase (EC 2.7.3.7) is an enzyme that catalyzes the reversible chemical reaction

guanidinoethyl methyl phosphate
ATP
ADP
ATP
ADP
N'-phosphoguanidinoethyl methylphosphate

The enzyme characterised from the marine annelid, Ophelia neglecta converts guanidinoethyl methyl phosphate (opheline) to the phosphagen, N'-phosphoguanidinoethyl methylphosphate, by transferring a phosphate group from the cofactor, adenosine triphosphate (ATP), which is converted to adenosine diphosphate (ADP). Unlike similar kinases such as lombricine kinase, the enzyme can phosphorylate a wider range of substrates including lombricine and taurocyamine.

This enzyme belongs to the family of transferases, specifically those transferring phosphorus-containing groups (phosphotransferases) with a nitrogenous group as acceptor. The systematic name of this enzyme class is ATP:guanidinoethyl-methyl-phosphate phosphotransferase.
