= RNTP =

Class of chemical compounds

A ribonucleotide tri-phosphate (rNTP) is composed of a ribose sugar, 3 phosphate groups attached via diester bonds to the 5' oxygen on the ribose and a nitrogenous base attached to the 1' carbon on the ribose. rNTP's are also referred to as NTPs while the deoxyribose version is referred to as dNTPs. The nitrogenous base can either be a purine such as a Adenine or Guanine or a pyrimidine such as a Uracil or Cytosine. rNTPs have significant biological uses, they can serve as building blocks of RNA synthesis, primers in DNA replication, stores of chemical energy, chiefly Adenosine triphosphate (ATP) and more.

== Comparison with dNTP ==
Concentration of rNTPs within the cell is 10 to 10^{6} times higher than the concentration of dNTP. Thus, during DNA replication the higher concentration of rNTP poses a problem as it can be erroneously incorporated into the developing DNA strand by DNA polymerases. The usage of RNA primers during DNA replication is an example of a correct incorporation of rNTPs during the process. Although, overly long RNA primers can decrease the effectiveness of T7 DNA polymerase in incorporating dNTP into the growing strand and weaken the binding between T7 and the template DNA strand. Essentially as the RNA primer grows, these rNMP residues inhibit RNA synthesis, decrease dNTP incorporation efficiency, decrease affinity between the helicase, DNA polymerase and template DNA strand overall decreases productivity of the DNA-protein complex. rNMPs are rNTPs without a pyrophosphate group attached, 2 P_{i}. However, DNA polymerases have a method to prevent rNTP incorporation centered around the major distinguishing feature between ribose and deoxyribose sugar bases, that feature being the absence of a 2'-OH on the deoxyribose. The use of a steric gate residue present on the DNA polymerase prevents incorporation of rNTP by creating a steric clash between an active site amino acid residue on the DNA polymerase and the 2'-OH on the sugar base of the rNTP. This steric clash is absent when incorporating dNTP since the sugar base on dNTPs have a 2'-H instead of a 2'-OH. Specifically the amino acid tyrosine positioned at residue 416 in DNA polymerase serves as the steric residue gate to prevent rNTP incorporation while in RNA polymerase the presence of a stabilizing electrostatic interaction between the 2'-OH on the ribose allows for correct incorporation into a growing RNA strand as opposed to dNTP incorporation. The results obtained from using changes in the free energy of the transition state of T7 DNA polymerase and RNA polymerase when binding to either dNTP or rNTP substrates support the above method of discriminating between rNTP and dNTP during their respective biological procedures. The presence of correct water binding during dNTP or rNTP incorporation is also necessary. However, a specific human DNA polymerase known as DNA polymerase η incorporates rNTPs into the developing DNA strand at points in which the template strand has lesions or is damaged. DNA polymerase η ensures that the rNTP being incorporated is complementary to the DNA residue of the template strand based on Watson and Crick base pairing rules. It overcomes the steric interference with the steric gate residue via propeller twist of to allow enough space for the 2'-OH. Incorporation of the appropriate rNTP into the developing DNA strand allows for corrections to be done on segments of the DNA that are damaged or have lesions.
