= NDPCP =

Nucleotide

5'-guanosyl-methylene-triphosphate

5'-adenosyl-methylene-triphosphate

5'-guanosyl-methylene-triphosphate (GDPCP) and 5'-adenosyl-methylene-triphosphate (ADPCP) are analogues of guanosine 5'-triphosphate (GTP) and adenosine 5'-triphosphate (ATP), which store chemical energy from metabolism in the cell. Hydrolysis of nucleoside triphosphates (NTPs) such as ATP and GTP yields energy, inorganic phosphate (P_{i} or PP_{i}), and either NDP or NMP. GDPCP and ADPCP are not subject to hydrolysis under the same conditions as NTPs; it is this property which makes them useful in experiments in biochemistry and molecular biology.

NTPs can be hydrolyzed at the phosphodiester bonds between phosphates, releasing energy and one or more of the three phosphate groups. Additionally, NTPs are inextricable components of some proteins, where their role may be structural and need not involve hydrolysis. In some cases, the presence of an NTP may be required for association of one protein with another, while hydrolysis is necessary for dissociation. GDPCP and ADPCP could be used in such a case, since association can still occur, but hydrolysis-dependent dissociation cannot.

GDPCP was used to examine the prokaryotic elongation factor EF-Tu. EF-Tu is required for the elongation phase of protein synthesis (translation). EF-Tu requires GTP in order for the ribosome to bind it, necessary for recruiting an aminoacyl-tRNA. The later dissociation of EF-Tu from the ribosome, however, requires that the GTP first be hydrolyzed to GDP and P_{i}. GDPCP was used in place of GTP to differentiate between these two steps: the elongation factor could associate, but without hydrolysis, it was effectively stuck.
