= Hypotaurocyamine kinase =

Identifiers
- EC no.: 2.7.3.6
- CAS no.: 9026-57-7

Databases
- IntEnz: IntEnz view
- BRENDA: BRENDA entry
- ExPASy: NiceZyme view
- KEGG: KEGG entry
- MetaCyc: metabolic pathway
- PRIAM: profile
- PDB structures: RCSB PDB PDBe PDBsum
- Gene Ontology: AmiGO / QuickGO
Search
- PMC: articles
- PubMed: articles
- NCBI: proteins

Hypotaurocyamine kinase (EC 2.7.3.6) is an enzyme that catalyzes the reversible chemical reaction

hypotaurocyamine
ATP
ADP
ATP
ADP
N(omega)-phosphohypotaurocyamine

The enzyme characterised from sipunculid worms converts hypotaurocyamine to N-phosphohypotaurocyamine by transferring a phosphate group from the cofactor, adenosine triphosphate (ATP), which is converted to adenosine diphosphate (ADP). There is evidence that the gene encoding this enzyme evolved from one coding for arginine kinase. The reaction is reversible for the phosphagen product.

This enzyme belongs to the family of transferases, specifically those transferring phosphorus-containing groups (phosphotransferases) with a nitrogenous group as acceptor. The systematic name of this enzyme class is ATP:hypotaurocyamine N-phosphotransferase.
