= Agmatine kinase =

Identifiers
- EC no.: 2.7.3.10
- CAS no.: 71061-39-7

Databases
- IntEnz: IntEnz view
- BRENDA: BRENDA entry
- ExPASy: NiceZyme view
- KEGG: KEGG entry
- MetaCyc: metabolic pathway
- PRIAM: profile
- PDB structures: RCSB PDB PDBe PDBsum
- Gene Ontology: AmiGO / QuickGO
Search
- PMC: articles
- PubMed: articles
- NCBI: proteins

Agmatine kinase (EC 2.7.3.10) is an enzyme that catalyzes the reversible chemical reaction

agmatine
ATP
ADP
ATP
ADP
N(4)-phosphoagmatine

The enzyme characterised from the protozoans, Euglena oracilis and Ochramonas danica converts agmatine to the phosphagen, N(4)-phosphoagmatine, by transferring a phosphate group from the cofactor, adenosine triphosphate (ATP), which is converted to adenosine diphosphate (ADP). The enzyme can phosphorylate L-arginine at a lower rate.

This enzyme is a transferase, specifically one transferring phosphorus-containing groups (phosphotransferases) with a nitrogenous group as acceptor. The systematic name of this enzyme class is ATP:agmatine N4-phosphotransferase. Other names in common use include phosphagen phosphokinase, and ATP:agmatine 4-N-phosphotransferase.
