= ATP hydrolysis =

Catabolism of ATP into ADP

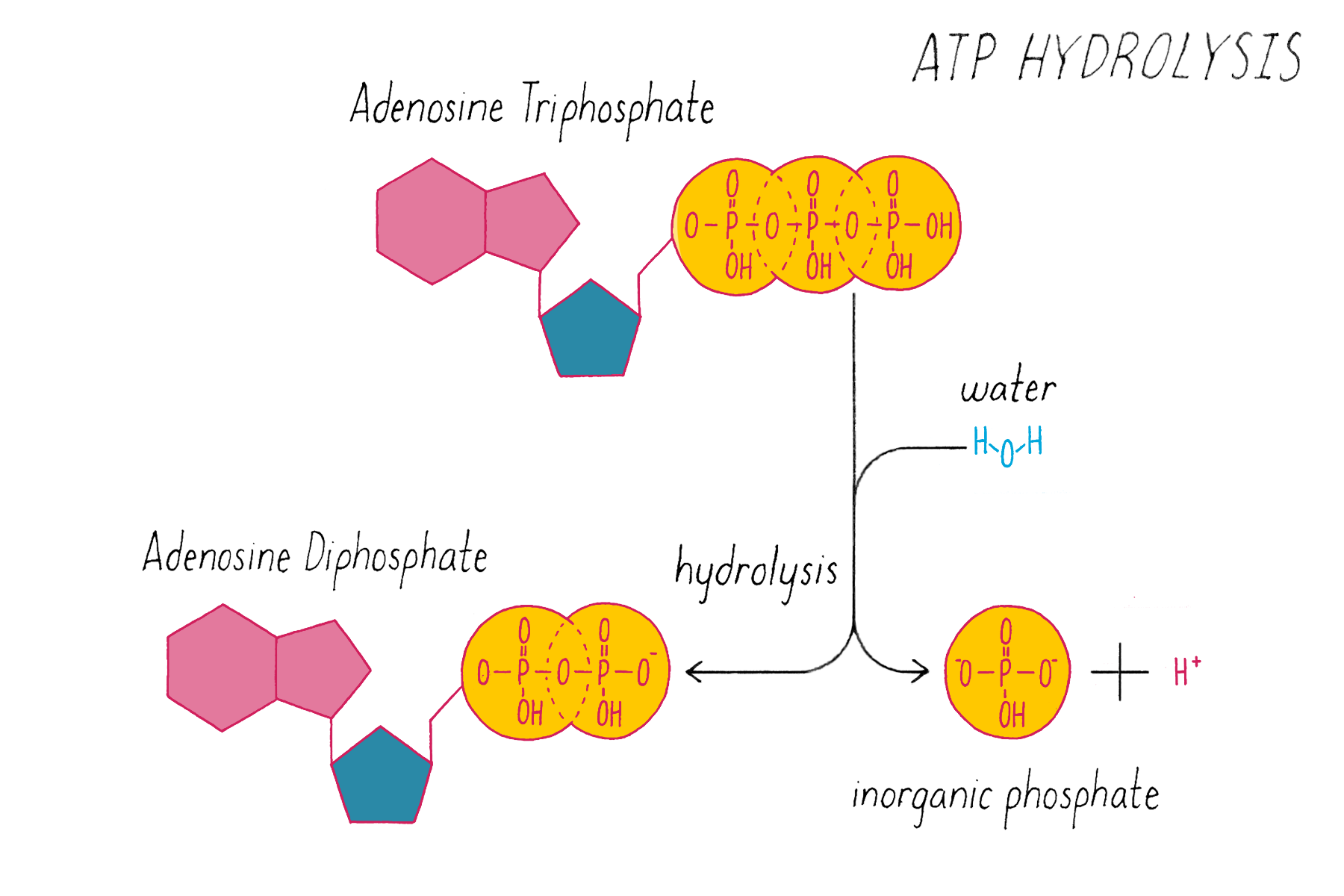
In a reaction catalyzed by ATPase enzymes, adenosine triphosphate is hydrolyzed to ADP and phosphate.

Structure of ATP

Structure of ADP

Four possible resonance structures for inorganic phosphate

ATP hydrolysis is the catabolic reaction process by which chemical energy that has been stored in the high-energy phosphoanhydride bonds in adenosine triphosphate (ATP) is released after splitting these bonds, for example in muscles, by producing work in the form of mechanical energy. The product is adenosine diphosphate (ADP) and an inorganic phosphate (P_{i}). ADP can be further hydrolyzed to give energy, adenosine monophosphate (AMP), and another inorganic phosphate (P_{i}). ATP hydrolysis is the final link between the energy derived from food or sunlight and useful work such as muscle contraction, the establishment of electrochemical gradients across membranes, and biosynthetic processes necessary to maintain life.

Anhydridic bonds are often labelled as "high-energy bonds". P-O bonds are in fact fairly strong (~30 kJ/mol stronger than C-N bonds) and themselves not particularly easy to break. As noted below, energy is released by the hydrolysis of ATP. However, when the P-O bonds are broken, input of energy is required. It is the formation of new bonds and lower-energy inorganic phosphate with a release of a larger amount of energy that lowers the total energy of the system and makes it more stable.

Hydrolysis of the phosphate groups in ATP is especially exergonic, because the resulting inorganic phosphate molecular ion is greatly stabilized by multiple resonance structures, making the products (ADP and P_{i}) lower in energy than the reactant (ATP). The high negative charge density associated with the three adjacent phosphate units of ATP also destabilizes the molecule, making it higher in energy. Hydrolysis relieves some of these electrostatic repulsions, liberating useful energy in the process by causing conformational changes in enzyme structure.

In humans, approximately 60 percent of the energy released from the hydrolysis of ATP produces metabolic heat rather than fuel the actual reactions taking place. Due to the acid-base properties of ATP, ADP, and inorganic phosphate, the hydrolysis of ATP has the effect of lowering the pH of the reaction medium. Under certain conditions, high levels of ATP hydrolysis can contribute to lactic acidosis.

== Amount of energy produced ==
Hydrolysis of the terminal phosphoanhydridic bond is a highly exergonic process. The amount of released energy depends on the conditions in a particular cell. Specifically, the energy released is dependent on concentrations of ATP, ADP and P_{i}. As the concentrations of these molecules deviate from values at equilibrium, the value of Gibbs free energy change (ΔG) will be increasingly different. In standard conditions (ATP, ADP and P_{i} concentrations are equal to 1M, water concentration is equal to 55 M) the value of ΔG is between -28 and -34 kJ/mol.

The range of the ΔG value exists because this reaction is dependent on the concentration of Mg^{2+} cations, which stabilize the ATP molecule. The cellular environment also contributes to differences in the ΔG value since ATP hydrolysis is dependent not only on the studied cell, but also on the surrounding tissue and even the compartment within the cell. Variability in the ΔG values is therefore to be expected.

The relationship between the standard Gibbs free energy change Δ_{r}G^{o} and chemical equilibrium is revealing. This relationship is defined by the equation Δ_{r}G^{o} = -RT ln(K), where K is the equilibrium constant, which is equal to the reaction quotient Q in equilibrium. The standard value of ΔG for this reaction is, as mentioned, between -28 and -34 kJ/mol; however, experimentally determined concentrations of the involved molecules reveal that the reaction is not at equilibrium. Given this fact, a comparison between the equilibrium constant, K, and the reaction quotient, Q, provides insight. K takes into consideration reactions taking place in standard conditions, but in the cellular environment the concentrations of the involved molecules (namely, ATP, ADP, and P_{i}) are far from the standard 1 M. In fact, the concentrations are more appropriately measured in mM, which is smaller than M by three orders of magnitude. Using these nonstandard concentrations, the calculated value of Q is much less than one. By relating Q to ΔG using the equation ΔG = Δ_{r}G^{o} + RT ln(Q), where Δ_{r}G^{o} is the standard change in Gibbs free energy for the hydrolysis of ATP, it is found that the magnitude of ΔG is much greater than the standard value. The nonstandard conditions of the cell actually result in a more favorable reaction.

In one particular study, to determine ΔG in vivo in humans, the concentration of ATP, ADP, and P_{i} was measured using nuclear magnetic resonance. In human muscle cells at rest, the concentration of ATP was found to be around 4 mM and the concentration of ADP was around 9 μM. Inputing these values into the above equations yields ΔG = -64 kJ/mol. After ischemia, when the muscle is recovering from exercise, the concentration of ATP is as low as 1 mM and the concentration of ADP is around 7 μM. Therefore, the absolute ΔG would be as high as -69 kJ/mol.

By comparing the standard value of ΔG and the experimental value of ΔG, one can see that the energy released from the hydrolysis of ATP, as measured in humans, is almost twice as much as the energy produced under standard conditions.

== See also ==
- Dephosphorylation
