= Lombricine kinase =

Class of enzymes

Identifiers
- EC no.: 2.7.3.5
- CAS no.: 9026-53-3

Databases
- IntEnz: IntEnz view
- BRENDA: BRENDA entry
- ExPASy: NiceZyme view
- KEGG: KEGG entry
- MetaCyc: metabolic pathway
- PRIAM: profile
- PDB structures: RCSB PDB PDBe PDBsum
- Gene Ontology: AmiGO / QuickGO
Search
- PMC: articles
- PubMed: articles
- NCBI: proteins

Lombricine kinase (EC 2.7.3.5) is an enzyme that catalyzes the chemical reaction

L-lombricine
ATP
ADP
N-phospho-L-lombricine

The enzyme first characterised from the worm species, Lumbricus terrestris, converts the phosphagen, lombricine, to N-phospholombricine by transferring a phosphate group from the cofactor, adenosine triphosphate (ATP), which is converted to adenosine diphosphate (ADP). The enzyme is found widely in annelids, where D-lombricine is the favoured form but some marine worms (echiuroids) contain L-lombricine derived from L-serine. The enzyme is one of a group of phosphagen kinases that includes hypotaurocyamine kinase.

This enzyme is a transferase, specifically one transferring phosphorus-containing groups (phosphotransferases) with a nitrogenous group as acceptor. The systematic name of this enzyme class is ATP:lombricine N-phosphotransferase.
