= Adenosine-tetraphosphatase =

Class of enzymes

Identifiers
- EC no.: 3.6.1.14
- CAS no.: 37289-26-2

Databases
- BRENDA: enzyme data
- ExPASy: NiceZyme view
- KEGG: enzyme entry
- MetaCyc: metabolic pathway
- Rhea: reactions
- PDB structures: RCSB PDB PDBe PDBsum
- Gene Ontology: AmiGO / QuickGO
Search
- PMC: articles
- PubMed: articles
- NCBI: proteins

Adenosine-tetraphosphatase (EC 3.6.1.14) is an enzyme characterised from rabbit muscle that catalyzes the hydrolysis of adenosine 5'-tetraphosphate to adenosine triphosphate and orthophosphate:

adenosine 5'-tetraphosphate
H_{2}O
P_{i}
adenosine triphosphate

The enzyme is also found in plants and animals and is a type of exopolyphosphatase.

This enzyme is a hydrolase, specifically one acting on acid anhydrides in phosphorus-containing anhydrides. The systematic name of this enzyme class is adenosine-tetraphosphate phosphohydrolase.

== Structural studies ==
As of late 2007, only one structure has been solved for this class of enzymes, with the PDB accession code PDB: 2V7Q.
