= Nucleoside triphosphate =

Class of chemical compounds

A nucleoside triphosphate is a nucleoside containing a nitrogenous base bound to a 5-carbon sugar (either ribose or deoxyribose), with three phosphate groups bound to the sugar. They are the molecular precursors of both DNA and RNA, which are chains of nucleotides made through the processes of DNA replication and transcription. Nucleoside triphosphates also serve as a source of energy for cellular reactions and are involved in signalling pathways.

Nucleoside triphosphates cannot easily cross the cell membrane, so they are typically synthesized within the cell. Synthesis pathways differ depending on the specific nucleoside triphosphate being made, but given the many important roles of nucleoside triphosphates, synthesis is tightly regulated in all cases. Nucleoside analogues may also be used to treat viral infections. For example, azidothymidine (AZT) is a nucleoside analogue used to prevent and treat HIV/AIDS.

== Naming ==
The term nucleoside refers to a nitrogenous base linked to a 5-carbon sugar (either ribose or deoxyribose). Nucleotides are nucleosides covalently linked to one or more phosphate groups. To provide information about the number of phosphates, nucleotides may instead be referred to as nucleoside (mono, di, or tri) phosphates. Thus, nucleoside triphosphates are a type of nucleotide.

Nucleotides are commonly abbreviated with 3 letters (4 or 5 in case of deoxy- or dideoxy-nucleotides). The first letter indicates the identity of the nitrogenous base (e.g., A for adenine, G for guanine), the second letter indicates the number of phosphates (mono, di, tri), and the third letter is P, standing for phosphate. Nucleoside triphosphates that contain ribose as the sugar are conventionally abbreviated as NTPs, while nucleoside triphosphates containing deoxyribose as the sugar are abbreviated as dNTPs. For example, dATP stands for deoxyribose adenosine triphosphate. NTPs are the building blocks of RNA, and dNTPs are the building blocks of DNA.

The carbons of the sugar in a nucleoside triphosphate are numbered around the carbon ring starting from the original carbonyl of the sugar. Conventionally, the carbon numbers in a sugar are followed by the prime symbol (') to distinguish them from the carbons of the nitrogenous base. The nitrogenous base is linked to the 1' carbon through a glycosidic bond, and the phosphate groups are covalently linked to the 5' carbon. The first phosphate group linked to the sugar is termed the α-phosphate, the second is the β-phosphate, and the third is the γ-phosphate; these are linked to one another by two phosphoanhydride bonds.

Schematic showing the structure of nucleoside triphosphates. Nucleosides consist of a 5-carbon sugar (pentose) connected to a nitrogenous base through a 1' glycosidic bond. Nucleotides are nucleosides with a variable number of phosphate groups connected to the 5' carbon. Nucleoside triphosphates are a specific type of nucleotide. This figure also shows the five common nitrogenous bases found in DNA and RNA on the right.

== DNA and RNA synthesis ==
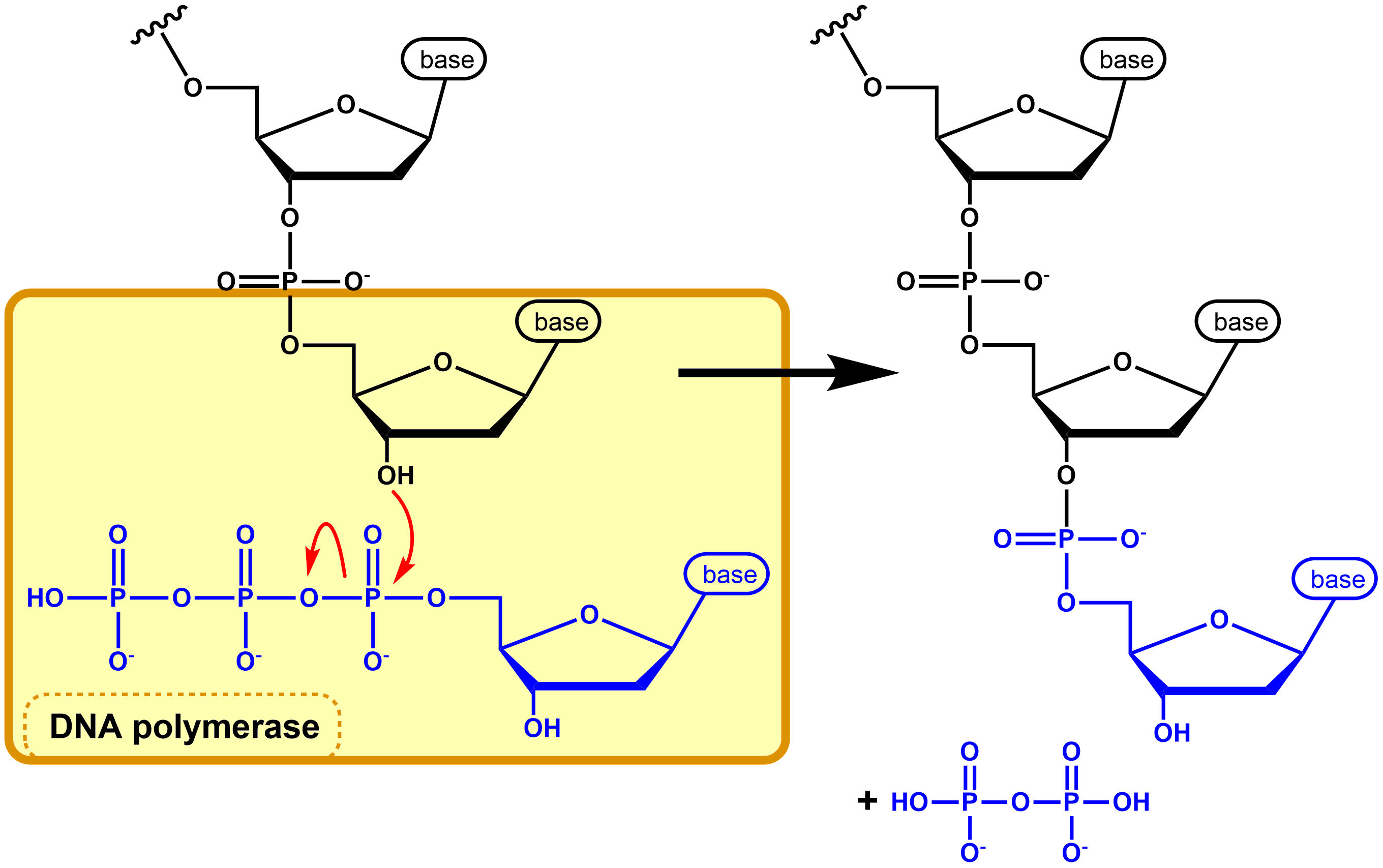
In nucleic acid synthesis, the 3' OH of a growing chain of nucleotides attacks the α-phosphate on the next NTP to be incorporated (blue), resulting in a phosphodiester linkage and the release of pyrophosphate (PP_{i}). This figure shows DNA synthesis, but RNA synthesis occurs through the same mechanism.

The cellular processes of DNA replication and transcription involve DNA and RNA synthesis, respectively. DNA synthesis uses dNTPs as substrates, while RNA synthesis uses rNTPs as substrates. NTPs cannot be converted directly to dNTPs. DNA contains four different nitrogenous bases: adenine, guanine, cytosine and thymine. RNA also contains adenine, guanine, and cytosine, but replaces thymine with uracil. Thus, DNA synthesis requires dATP, dGTP, dCTP, and dTTP as substrates, while RNA synthesis requires ATP, GTP, CTP, and UTP.

Nucleic acid synthesis is catalyzed by either DNA polymerase or RNA polymerase for DNA and RNA synthesis respectively. These enzymes covalently link the free -OH group on the 3' carbon of a growing chain of nucleotides to the α-phosphate on the 5' carbon of the next (d)NTP, releasing the β- and γ-phosphate groups as pyrophosphate (PP_{i}). This results in a phosphodiester linkage between the two (d)NTPs. The release of PP_{i} provides the energy necessary for the reaction to occur. Nucleic acid synthesis occurs exclusively in the 5' to 3' direction.

== Nucleoside triphosphate metabolism ==
Given their importance in the cell, the synthesis and degradation of nucleoside triphosphates is under tight control. This section focuses on nucleoside triphosphate metabolism in humans, but the process is fairly conserved among species. Nucleoside triphosphates cannot be absorbed well, so all nucleoside triphosphates are typically made de novo. The synthesis of ATP and GTP (purines) differs from the synthesis of CTP, TTP, and UTP (pyrimidines). Both purine and pyrimidine synthesis use phosphoribosyl pyrophosphate (PRPP) as a starting molecule.

The conversion of NTPs to dNTPs can only be done in the diphosphate form. Typically a NTP has one phosphate removed to become a NDP, then is converted to a dNDP by an enzyme called ribonucleotide reductase, then a phosphate is added back to give a dNTP.

=== Purine synthesis ===
A nitrogenous base called hypoxanthine is assembled directly onto PRPP. This results in a nucleotide called inosine monophosphate (IMP). IMP is then converted to either a precursor to AMP or GMP. Once AMP or GMP are formed, they can be phosphorylated by ATP to their diphosphate and triphosphate forms.

Purine synthesis is regulated by the allosteric inhibition of IMP formation by the adenine or guanine nucleotides. AMP and GMP also competitively inhibit the formation of their precursors from IMP.

=== Pyrimidine synthesis ===
A nitrogenous base called orotate is synthesized independently of PRPP. After orotate is made it is covalently attached to PRPP. This results in a nucleotide called orotate monophosphate (OMP). OMP is converted to UMP, which can then be phosphorylated by ATP to UDP and UTP. UTP can then be converted to CTP by a deamination reaction. TTP is not a substrate for nucleic acid synthesis, so it is not synthesized in the cell. Instead, dTTP is made indirectly from either dUDP or dCDP after conversion to their respective deoxyribose forms.

Pyrimidine synthesis is regulated by the allosteric inhibition of orotate synthesis by UDP and UTP. PRPP and ATP are also allosteric activators of orotate synthesis.

=== Ribonucleotide reductase ===
Ribonucleotide reductase (RNR) is the enzyme responsible for converting NTPs to dNTPs. Given that dNTPs are used in DNA replication, the activity of RNR is tightly regulated. RNR can only process NDPs, so NTPs are first dephosphorylated to NDPs before conversion to dNDPs. dNDPs are then typically re-phosphorylated. RNR has 2 subunits and 3 sites: the catalytic site, activity (A) site, and specificity (S) site. The catalytic site is where the NDP to dNDP reaction takes place, the activity site determines whether or not the enzyme is active, and the specificity site determines which reaction takes place in the catalytic site.

The activity site can bind either ATP or dATP. When bound to ATP, RNR is active. When ATP or dATP is bound to the S site, RNR will catalyze synthesis of dCDP and dUDP from CDP and UDP. dCDP and dUDP can go on to indirectly make dTTP. dTTP bound to the S site will catalyze synthesis of dGDP from GDP, and binding of dGDP to the S site will promote synthesis of dADP from ADP. dADP is then phosphorylated to give dATP, which can bind to the A site and turn RNR off.

== Other cellular roles ==
=== ATP as a source of cellular energy ===
The energy released during hydrolysis of adenosine triphosphate (ATP), shown here, is frequently coupled with energetically unfavourable cellular reactions.

ATP is the primary energy currency of the cell. Despite being synthesized through the metabolic pathway described above, it is primarily synthesized during both cellular respiration and photosynthesis by ATP synthase. ATP synthase couples the synthesis of ATP from ADP and phosphate with an electrochemical gradient generated by the pumping of protons through either the inner mitochondrial membrane (cellular respiration) or the thylakoid membrane (photosynthesis). This electrochemical gradient is necessary because the formation of ATP is energetically unfavourable.

The hydrolysis of ATP to ADP and P_{i} proceeds as follows:

$$\ce{ATP + H2O -> ADP + P_{i}}$$

This reaction is energetically favourable and releases 30.5 kJ/mol of energy. In the cell, this reaction is often coupled with unfavourable reactions to provide the energy for them to proceed. GTP is occasionally used for energy-coupling in a similar manner.

Binding of a ligand to a G protein-coupled receptor allows GTP to bind the G protein. This causes the alpha subunit to leave and act as a downstream effector.

=== GTP signal transduction ===
GTP is essential for signal transduction, especially with G proteins. G proteins are coupled with a cell membrane bound receptor. This whole complex is called a G protein-coupled receptor (GPCR). G proteins can bind either GDP or GTP. When bound to GDP, G proteins are inactive. When a ligand binds a GPCR, an allosteric change in the G protein is triggered, causing GDP to leave and be replaced by GTP. GTP activates the alpha subunit of the G protein, causing it to dissociate from the G protein and act as a downstream effector.

== Nucleoside analogues ==
Nucleoside analogues can be used to treat viral infections. Nucleoside analogues are nucleosides that are structurally similar (analogous) to the nucleosides used in DNA and RNA synthesis. Once these nucleoside analogues enter a cell, they can become phosphorylated by a viral enzyme. The resulting nucleotides are similar enough to the nucleotides used in DNA or RNA synthesis to be incorporated into growing DNA or RNA strands, but they do not have an available 3' OH group to attach the next nucleotide, causing chain termination. This can be exploited for therapeutic uses in viral infections because viral DNA polymerase recognizes certain nucleotide analogues more readily than eukaryotic DNA polymerase. For example, azidothymidine is used in the treatment of HIV/AIDS. Some less selective nucleoside analogues can be used as chemotherapy agents to treat cancer, such as cytosine arabinose (ara-C) in the treatment of certain forms of leukemia.

Resistance to nucleoside analogues is common, and is frequently due to a mutation in the enzyme that phosphorylates the nucleoside after entry into the cell. This is common in nucleoside analogues used to treat HIV/AIDS.

== See also ==
- Biology
- Chromosome
- Gene
- Genetics
- Nucleic acid sequence
- Nucleobase
