= Philip Eggleton =

British biochemist

Philip Eggleton FRSE (19 March 1903 – 7 October 1954) was a British biochemist, physiologist, lecturer, and (with his wife Grace Palmer Eggleton), co-discoverer of Phosphagens.

== Life ==
Eggleton was born at Kingston-on-Thames on 19 March 1903. He attended the Tiffin School there before going to the University of London graduating BSc in 1922 and receiving his doctorate (DSc) in 1930.

He then received a post at the University of Edinburgh rising to Reader in Biochemistry in the Physiology Department. He also acted as Scientific Advisor to BBC Scotland.

In 1927, in experiments on frog muscles in Cambridge, he discovered the release (on passing an electrical current) of a previously unknown substance which he labelled phosphagen. It was shown that the substance played a major role in muscular contraction.

He was elected a Fellow of the Royal Society of Edinburgh in 1931. His proposers were Sir Edward Albert Sharpey-Schafer, Alfred Joseph Clark, and Henry Dryerre.

During the Second World War he served in the Gas Identification Service (part of the Edinburgh Civil Defence team).

Eggleton died on 7 October 1954, aged 51.

== Family ==
He married Grace Palmer (1901-1970) who worked with him. The two discovered phosphagens.

== Publications ==
- The Physiological Significance of Phosphagen (1927)
- Further Observations on Phosphagen (1928)
- A Problem in the Random Distribution of Particles (1944) with William Ogilvy Kermack
- The Use of Sodium Sulphate for the Preparation of Concentrated Protein-Free Tissue Extracts
