= Taurocyamine kinase =

Identifiers
- EC no.: 2.7.3.4
- CAS no.: 9026-72-6

Databases
- BRENDA: enzyme data
- ExPASy: NiceZyme view
- KEGG: enzyme entry
- MetaCyc: metabolic pathway
- Rhea: reactions
- PDB structures: RCSB PDB PDBe PDBsum
- Gene Ontology: AmiGO / QuickGO
Search
- PMC: articles
- PubMed: articles
- NCBI: proteins

Taurocyamine kinase (EC 2.7.3.4) is an enzyme that catalyzes the chemical reaction

ATP +
taurocyamine
ADP +
N-phosphotaurocyamine

The enzyme characterised from several species of polychaete worms converts taurocyamine to N-phosphotaurocyamine by transferring a phosphate group from the cofactor, adenosine triphosphate (ATP), which is converted to adenosine diphosphate (ADP). The reaction is part of the metabolism of taurine and hypotaurine.

This enzyme is a transferase, specifically one transferring phosphorus-containing groups (phosphotransferases) with a nitrogenous group as acceptor. The systematic name of this enzyme class is ATP:taurocyamine N-phosphotransferase. Other names in common use include taurocyamine phosphotransferase, and ATP:taurocyamine phosphotransferase.
