= ATP test =

Microbiology measurement process

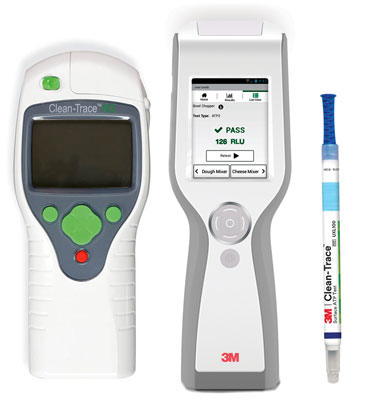
Clean-Trace ATP measuring devices

The ATP test is a process of rapidly measuring actively growing microorganisms through detection of adenosine triphosphate, or ATP.

== Method ==
ATP is a molecule found in and around living cells, and as such it gives a direct measure of biological concentration and health. ATP is quantified by measuring the light produced through its reaction with the naturally occurring firefly enzyme luciferase using a luminometer. The amount of light produced is directly proportional to the amount of ATP present in the sample.

ATP tests can be used to:

- Control biological treatment reactors
- Guide biocide dosing programs
- Determine drinking water cleanliness
- Manage fermentation processes
- Assess soil activity
- Determine corrosion / deposit process type
- Measure equipment or product sanitation

== 1st-generation testing vs. 2nd-generation testing ==
1st-generation ATP tests are derived from hygiene monitoring uses where samples are relatively free of interferences. 2nd-generation tests are specifically designed for water, wastewater and industrial applications where, for the most part, samples contain a variety of components that can interfere with the ATP assay.

== How ATP is measured ==
ATP is a molecule found only in and around living cells, and as such it gives a direct measure of biological concentration and health. ATP is quantified by measuring the light produced through its reaction with the naturally occurring firefly enzyme luciferase using a luminometer. The amount of light produced is directly proportional to the amount of biological energy present in the sample.

Within a water sample containing microorganisms, there are two types of ATP:

- Intracellular ATP – ATP contained within living biological cells.
- Extracellular ATP – ATP located outside of biological cells that has been released from dead or stressed organisms.

Accurate measurement of these two types of ATP is critical to utilizing ATP-based measurements. Being able to accurately measure these different types of ATP offers the ability to assess biological health and activity, and subsequently control water and wastewater processes.

== See also ==
- Adenosine triphosphate
