= Adenosine 5'-tetraphosphate =

Names
- IUPAC name Adenosine 5′-(pentahydrogen tetraphosphate)
- Systematic IUPAC name O^{1}-{{#parsoidfragment:0}}{[(2R,3S,4R,5R)-5-(6-Amino-9H-purin-9-yl)-3,4-dihydroxyoxolan-2-yl]methyl} pentahydrogen tetraphosphate
- Other names Adenosine tetraphosphate

Identifiers
CAS Number	1062-98-2
3D model (JSmol)	Interactive image
ChEBI	CHEBI:18334
ChEMBL	ChEMBL490984
ChemSpider	13390
KEGG	C03483
PubChem CID	14003
UNII	DBK98M4ZT7
CompTox Dashboard (EPA)	DTXSID901261206
- InChI: InChI=1S/C10H17N5O16P4/c11-8-5-9(13-2-12-8)15(3-14-5)10-7(17)6(16)4(28-10)1-27-33(21,22)30-35(25,26)31-34(23,24)29-32(18,19)20/h2-4,6-7,10,16-17H,1H2,(H,21,22)(H,23,24)(H,25,26)(H2,11,12,13)(H2,18,19,20)/t4-,6-,7-,10-/m1/s1 Key: WWMWAMFHUSTZTA-KQYNXXCUSA-N
- SMILES: Nc1ncnc2n(cnc12)[C@@H]1O[C@H](COP(O)(=O)OP(O)(=O)OP(O)(=O)OP(O)(O)=O)[C@@H](O)[C@H]1O

Properties
Chemical formula	C_{10}H_{17}N_{5}O_{16}P_{4}
Molar mass	587.160 g·mol^{−1}
- Except where otherwise noted, data are given for materials in their standard state (at 25 °C [77 °F], 100 kPa). Infobox references

Adenosine 5′-tetraphosphate, Ap4 or ATPP is a nucleotide. It is produced from ATP and triphosphate (P_{3}) through the action of acetyl—CoA synthetase. Acetyl—CoA synthetase also produces adenosine 5'-pentaphosphate through the reaction of ADP and tetraphosphate (P_{4}).

== Functions ==
ATPP has been found to play physiological roles in some mammals.

=== Rabbits ===
ATPP is a constituent of aqueous humor in rabbits, where it was found to reduce the intraocular pressure.

=== Rats ===
ATPP has been suggested to play a regulatory role in rat aorta.
