= Lombricine =

- D-lombricine

Names
- IUPAC name O-[{2-[(Diaminomethylene)amino]ethoxy}(hydroxy)phosphoryl]-D-serine
- Other names D-Lombricine

Identifiers
CAS Number	79342-60-2
3D model (JSmol)	Interactive image
ChEBI	CHEBI:32969
ChemSpider	388647
PubChem CID	439556
UNII	YMK242B63W
CompTox Dashboard (EPA)	DTXSID101156421
- InChI: InChI=1S/C6H15N4O6P/c7-4(5(11)12)3-16-17(13,14)15-2-1-10-6(8)9/h4H,1-3,7H2,(H,11,12)(H,13,14)(H4,8,9,10)/t4-/m1/s1 Key: GSDBGCKBBJVPNC-SCSAIBSYSA-N; InChI=1/C6H15N4O6P/c7-4(5(11)12)3-16-17(13,14)15-2-1-10-6(8)9/h4H,1-3,7H2,(H,11,12)(H,13,14)(H4,8,9,10)/t4-/m1/s1 Key: GSDBGCKBBJVPNC-SCSAIBSYBR
- SMILES: O=C(O)[C@H](N)COP(=O)(OCC/N=C(\N)N)O

Properties
Chemical formula	C_{6}H_{15}N_{4}O_{6}P
Molar mass	270.182 g·mol^{−1}
- Except where otherwise noted, data are given for materials in their standard state (at 25 °C [77 °F], 100 kPa). Infobox references

Lombricine is a phosphagen that is unique to earthworms. Structurally, it is a phosphodiester of 2-guanidinoethanol and the amino acid serine and is found in both enantiomeric forms. In many worm species it is further phosphorylated by lombricine kinase to N-phospholombricine.

== Metabolism ==
Lombricine kinase is the enzyme first characterised from the worm species, Lumbricus terrestris, that converts lombricine to N-phospholombricine using adenosine triphosphate (ATP) as the source of the transferred phosphate group.

L-lombricine
ATP
ADP
N-phospho-L-lombricine

The enzyme is found widely in annelids, where D-lombricine is the favoured form but some marine worms (echiuroids) contain L-lombricine derived from L-serine.
