= Arginine kinase =

Class of enzymes

Identifiers
- EC no.: 2.7.3.3
- CAS no.: 9026-70-4

Databases
- BRENDA: enzyme data
- ExPASy: NiceZyme view
- KEGG: enzyme entry
- MetaCyc: metabolic pathway
- Rhea: reactions
- PDB structures: RCSB PDB PDBe PDBsum
- Gene Ontology: AmiGO / QuickGO
Search
- PMC: articles
- PubMed: articles
- NCBI: proteins

Arginine kinase (EC 2.7.3.3) is an enzyme that catalyzes the chemical reaction which converts L-arginine to N(omega)-phospho-L-arginine.

== Function ==
The enzyme characterised from crustacean muscle converts the amino acid L-arginine to N(omega)-phospho-L-arginine by transferring a phosphate group from the cofactor, adenosine triphosphate (ATP), which is converted to adenosine diphosphate (ADP).

ATP +
arginine
ADP +
N(omega)-phospho-L-arginine

Unlike the phosphoester bond formed during the phosphorylation of serine, threonine or tyrosine residues, the phosphoramidate (P-N bond) in phospho-arginine is unstable at low pH (<8), making it difficult to detect with the traditional mass spectrometry protocols.

In Gram-positive bacteria, such as Bacillus subtilis, the arginine kinase McsB phosphorylates the arginine residues on incorrectly folded or aggregated proteins to target them for degradation by the bacterial protease ClpC-ClpP (ClpCP).The phospho-arginine (pArg) modification is recognised by the N-terminal domain of ClpC, the protein-unfolding subunit of the ClpCP protease. Following recognition, the target protein is degraded by the ClpP subunit which has protease activity. Since phosphorylation reverses arginine's charge, the pArg modification has an unfolding effect on the target protein, easing its proteolytic degradation. Arginine phosphorylation is a dynamic post-translational modification, which can also be reversed by pArg-specific phosphatases, such as the bacterial YwlE. The pArg-ClpCP mechanism for protein degradation in bacteria is analogous to the eukaryotic ubiquitin-proteasome system.

Several studies have reported the presence of arginine kinases in eukaryotes. One study identified arginine phosphorylation on 118 proteins in Jurkat cells, which were primarily proteins with DNA/RNA-binding activities. The function of arginine phosphorylation in eukaryotes however is still unknown.

== Nomenclature ==
Arginine kinase is a transferase, specifically one transferring phosphorus-containing groups (phosphotransferases) with a nitrogenous group as acceptor. The systematic name of this enzyme class is ATP:L-arginine N^{ω}-phosphotransferase. Other names in common use include

- arginine phosphokinase,
- adenosine 5'-triphosphate: L-arginine phosphotransferase,
- adenosine 5'-triphosphate-arginine phosphotransferase,
- ATP:L-arginine N-phosphotransferasel ATP:L-arginine, and
- ω-N-phosphotransferase.

== Arginine kinase as an allergen ==
Arginine kinase has been identified as a major allergen in invertebrates, including edible insects such as the yellow mealworm Tenebrio molitor. The enzyme can act as an IgE-binding allergen, and sensitization to arginine kinase may result in allergic reactions in individuals already sensitized to homologous proteins from other arthropods (e.g., crustaceans, mites). Cross-reactivity mediated by IgE antibodies has been observed between arginine kinase from edible insects and allergens in shrimp and house dust mites, which means clinical reactions may occur even upon first exposure. The emergence of edible insects in the human diet highlights the importance of arginine kinase in assessing the allergenic risks of novel food proteins.

== Structural studies ==
As of late 2007, 8 structures have been solved for this class of enzymes, with PDB accession codes 1BG0, 1M15, 1M80, 1P50, 1P52, 1RL9, 1SD0, and 2J1Q.
