= High-energy phosphate =

High energy bond in phosphate-containing biomolecules

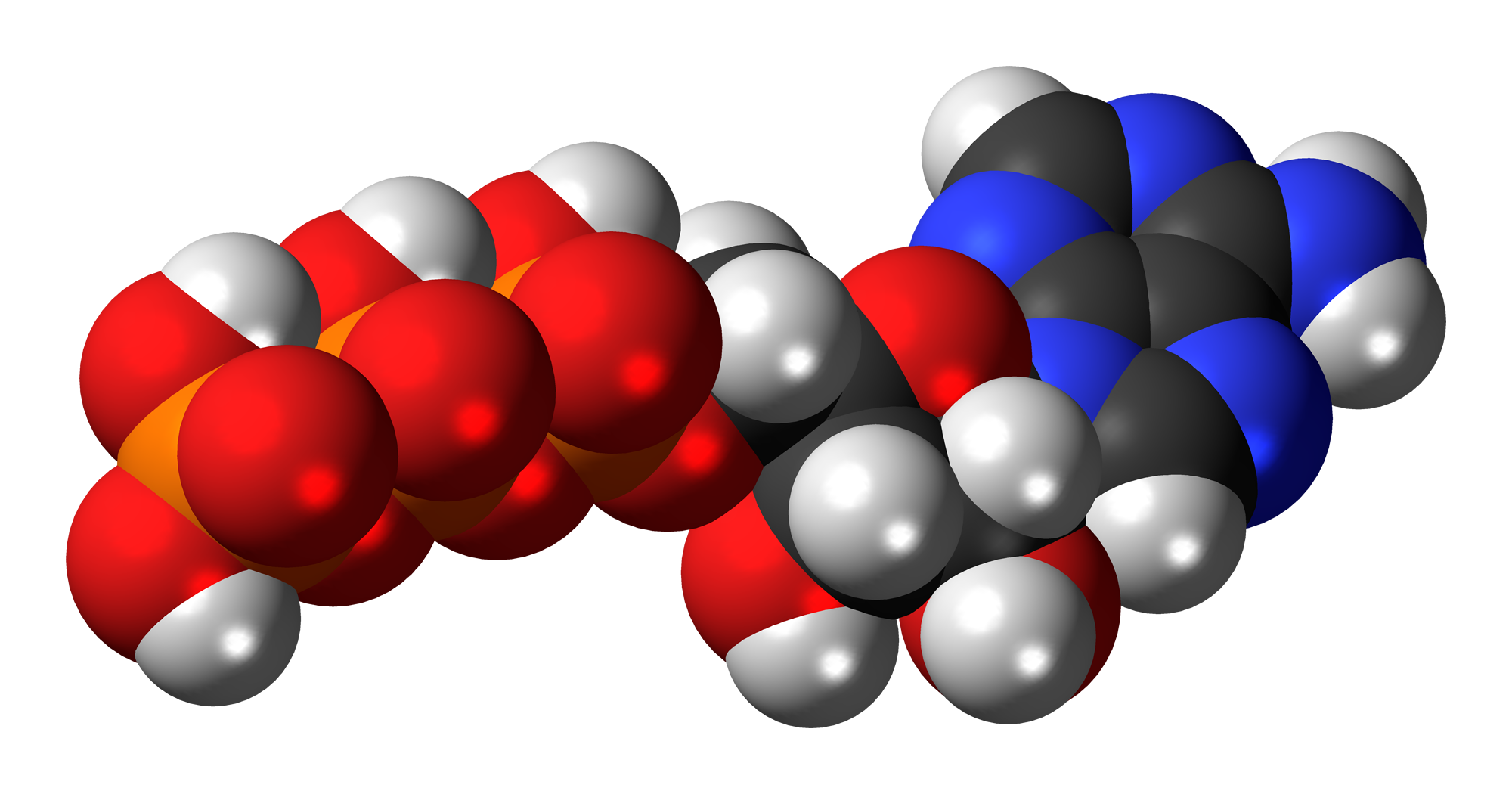
Space-filling model of the adenosine triphosphate molecule, also known as ATP, the nucleotide that functions as the primary energy carrier in cells, often called the "molecular unit of currency"

High-energy phosphate can mean one of two things:

- The phosphate-phosphate (phosphoanhydride/phosphoric anhydride/macroergic/phosphagen) bonds formed when compounds such as adenosine diphosphate (ADP) and adenosine triphosphate (ATP) are created.
- The compounds that contain these bonds, which include the nucleoside diphosphates and nucleoside triphosphates, and the high-energy storage compounds of the muscle, the phosphagens. When people speak of a high-energy phosphate pool, they speak of the total concentration of these compounds with these high-energy bonds.

== Description ==
High-energy phosphate bonds are usually pyrophosphate bonds, acid anhydride linkages formed by taking phosphoric acid derivatives and dehydrating them. As a consequence, the hydrolysis of these bonds is exergonic under physiological conditions, releasing Gibbs free energy.

"High energy" phosphate reactions
Reaction
ATP + H_{2}O → ADP + P_{i}
ADP + H_{2}O → AMP + P_{i}
ATP + H_{2}O → AMP + PP_{i}
PP_{i} + H_{2}O → 2 P_{i}

Except for PP_{i} → 2 P_{i}, these reactions are, in general, not allowed to go uncontrolled in cells but are instead coupled to other processes needing energy to drive them to completion. Thus, high-energy phosphate reactions can:

- provide energy to cellular processes, allowing them to run
- couple processes to a particular nucleoside, allowing for regulatory control of the process
- drive a reaction out of equilibrium (drive it to the right) by promoting one direction of the reaction faster than the equilibrium can relax.

The one exception is of value because it allows a single hydrolysis, ATP + H_{2}O → AMP + PP_{i}, to effectively supply the energy of hydrolysis of two high-energy bonds, with the hydrolysis of PP_{i} being allowed to go to completion in a separate reaction. The AMP is regenerated to ATP in two steps, with the equilibrium reaction ATP + AMP ↔ 2ADP, followed by regeneration of ATP by the usual means, oxidative phosphorylation or other energy-producing pathways such as glycolysis.

Often, high-energy phosphate bonds are denoted by the character '~'. In this "squiggle" notation, ATP becomes A-P~P~P. The squiggle notation was invented by Fritz Albert Lipmann, who first proposed ATP as the main energy transfer molecule of the cell, in 1941. Lipmann's notation emphasizes the special nature of these bonds. Stryer states:

ATP is often called a high energy compound and its phosphoanhydride bonds are referred to as high-energy bonds. There is nothing special about the bonds themselves. They are high-energy bonds in the sense that free energy is released when they are hydrolyzed, for the reasons given above. Lipmann’s term "high-energy bond" and his symbol ~P (squiggle P) for a compound having a high phosphate group transfer potential are vivid, concise, and useful notations. In fact Lipmann's squiggle did much to stimulate interest in bioenergetics.

The term 'high energy' with respect to these bonds can be misleading because the negative free energy change is not due directly to the breaking of the bonds themselves. The breaking of these bonds, like the breaking of most bonds, is endergonic and consumes energy rather than releasing it. The negative free energy change comes instead from the fact that the bonds formed after hydrolysis - or the phosphorylation of a residue by ATP - are lower in energy than the bonds present before hydrolysis. (This includes all of the bonds involved in the reaction, not just the phosphate bonds themselves). This effect is due to a number of factors including increased resonance stabilization and solvation of the products relative to the reactants, and destabilization of the reactants due to electrostatic repulsion between neighboring phosphorus atoms.
