= Phosphate =

Anion, salt, functional group or ester derived from a phosphoric acid

- Stereo skeletal formula of phosphate

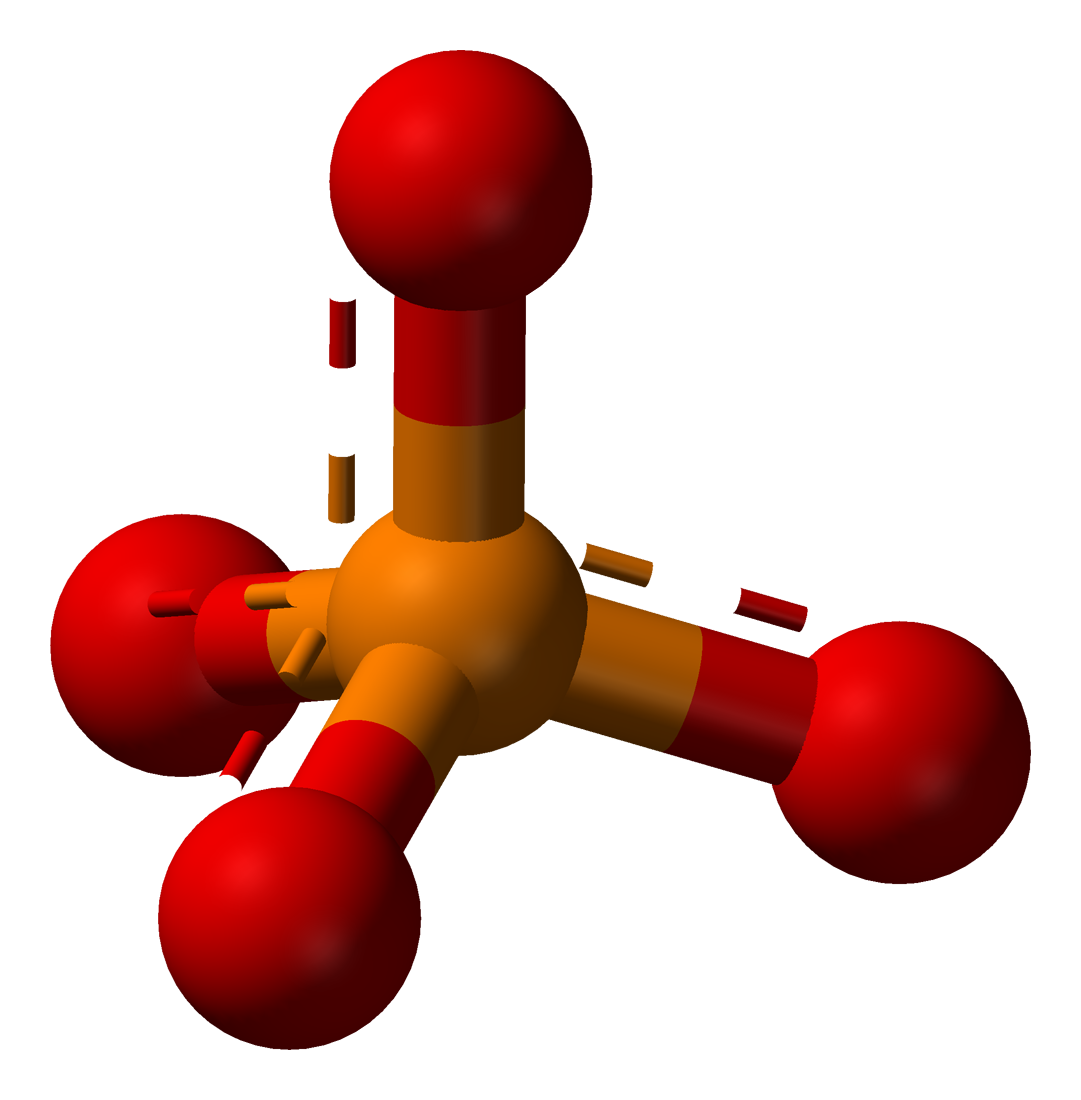
Aromatic ball and stick model of phosphate
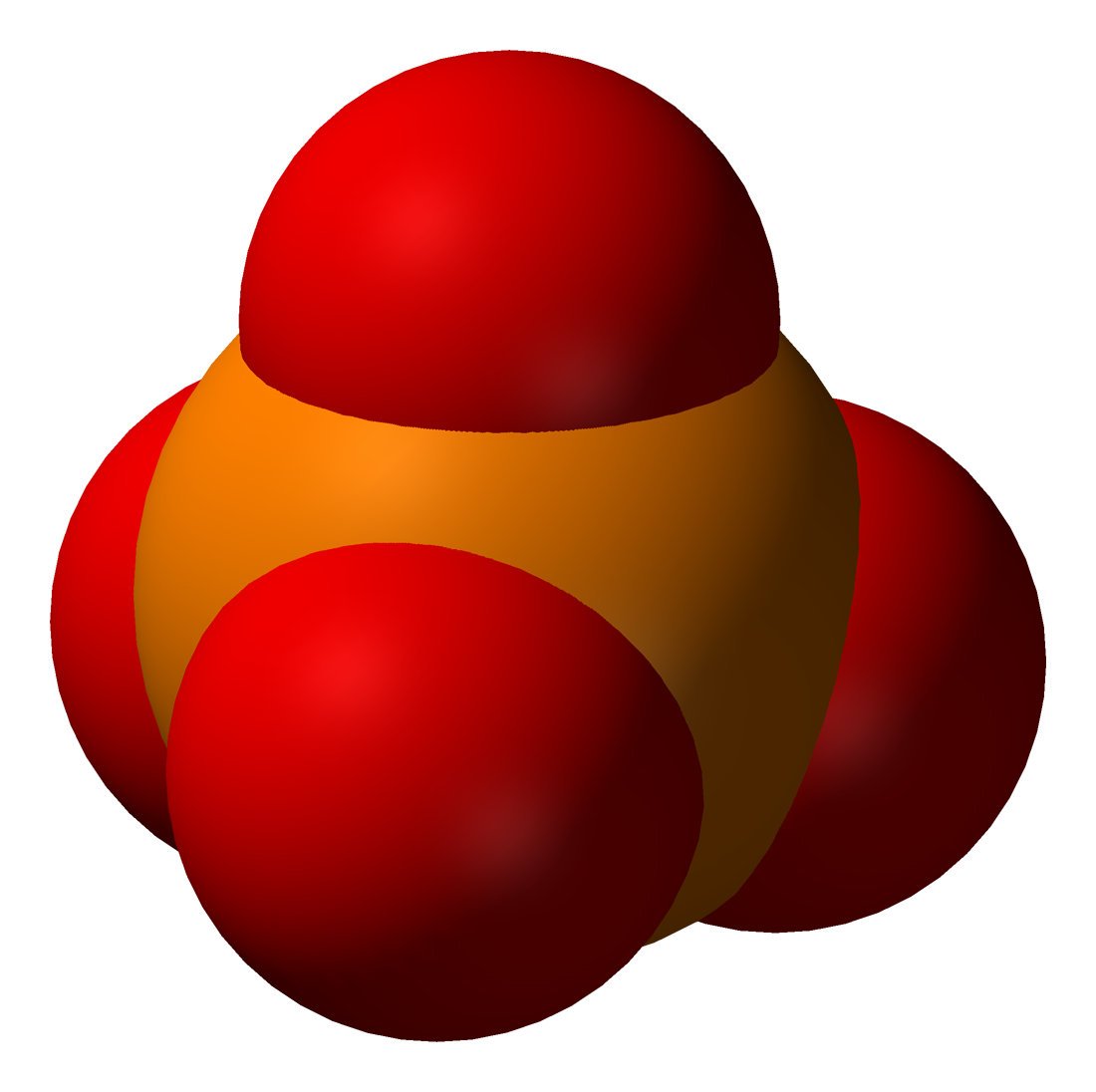
Space-filling model of phosphate

Names
- IUPAC name Phosphate
- Other names Orthophosphate; Tetraoxophosphate(V); Tetraoxidophosphate(V)

Identifiers
CAS Number	14265-44-2
3D model (JSmol)	hypervalent form: Interactive image; ionic form: Interactive image
Beilstein Reference	3903772
ChEBI	CHEBI:18367
ChemSpider	1032
Gmelin Reference	1997
MeSH	Phosphates
PubChem CID	1061
UNII	NK08V8K8HR
- InChI: InChI=1S/H3O4P/c1-5(2,3)4/h(H3,1,2,3,4)/p-3 Key: NBIIXXVUZAFLBC-UHFFFAOYSA-K
- SMILES: hypervalent form: [O-]P([O-])([O-])=O; ionic form: [O-][P+]([O-])([O-])[O-]

Properties
Chemical formula	PO_{4}^{3−}
Molar mass	94.9714 g mol^{−1}
Conjugate acid	Monohydrogen phosphate
- Except where otherwise noted, data are given for materials in their standard state (at 25 °C [77 °F], 100 kPa). verify (what is ?) Infobox references

A phosphate is an anion, salt, functional group or ester derived from a phosphoric acid. It most commonly means orthophosphate, a derivative of orthophosphoric acid, a.k.a. phosphoric acid H_{3}PO_{4}.

The phosphate or orthophosphate ion PO_{4}^{3−} is derived from phosphoric acid by the removal of three protons H^{+}. Removal of one proton gives the dihydrogen phosphate ion H_{2}PO_{4}^{−} while removal of two protons gives the hydrogen phosphate ion HPO_{4}^{2−}. These names are also used in chemistry for salts of those anions, such as ammonium dihydrogen phosphate and trisodium phosphate.

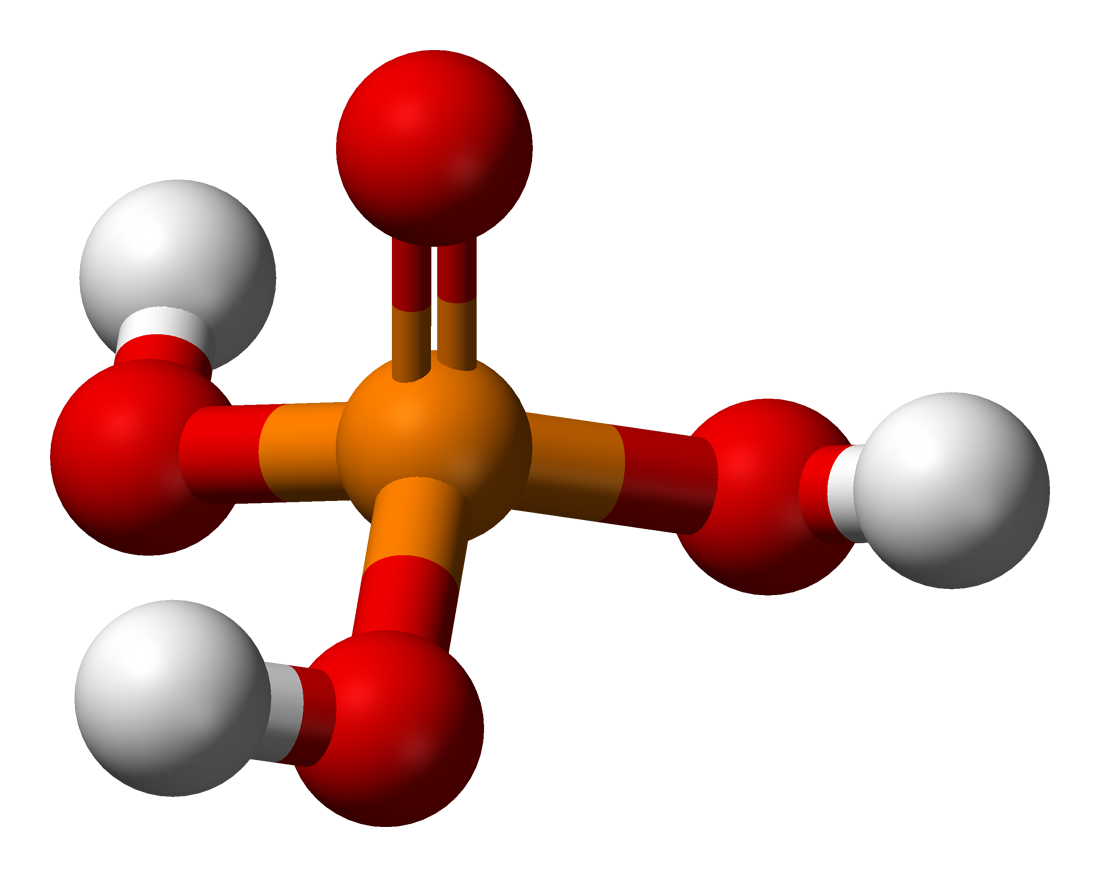
H_{3}PO_{4}
Phosphoric
acid

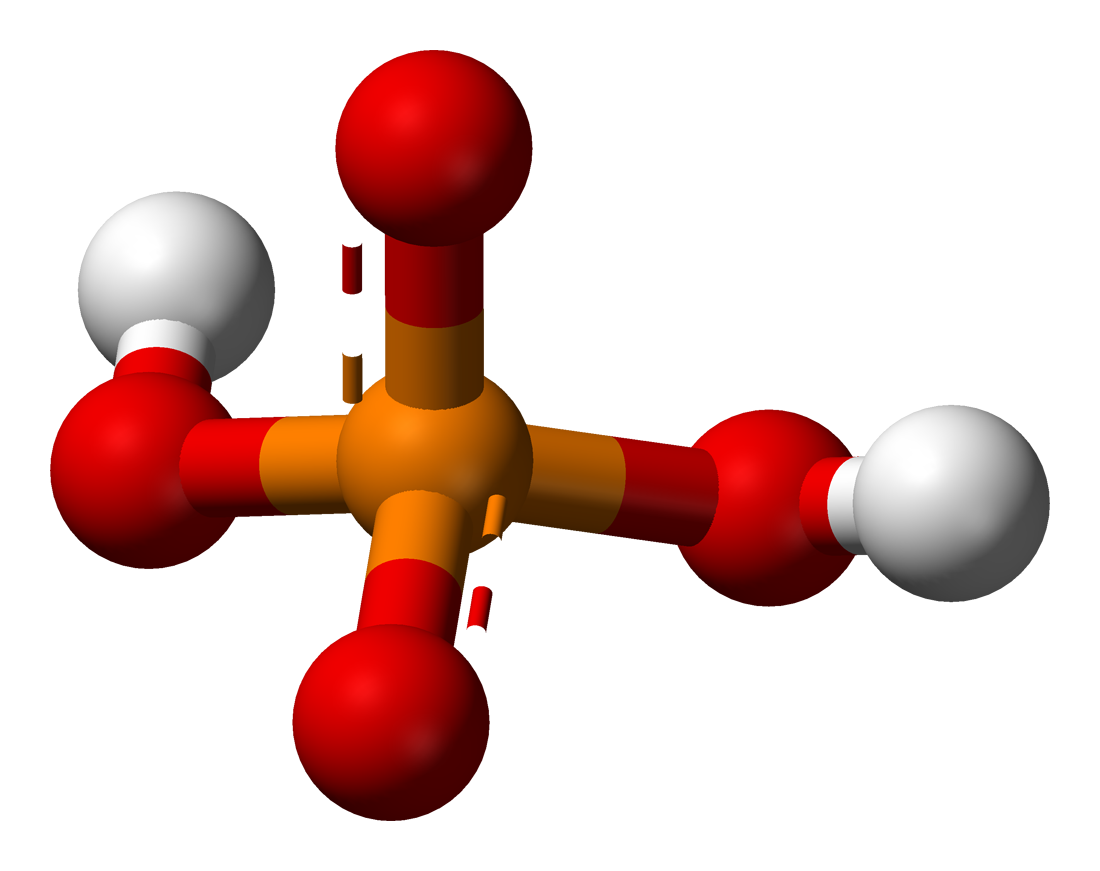
H_{2}PO_{4}^{−}
Dihydrogen
phosphate

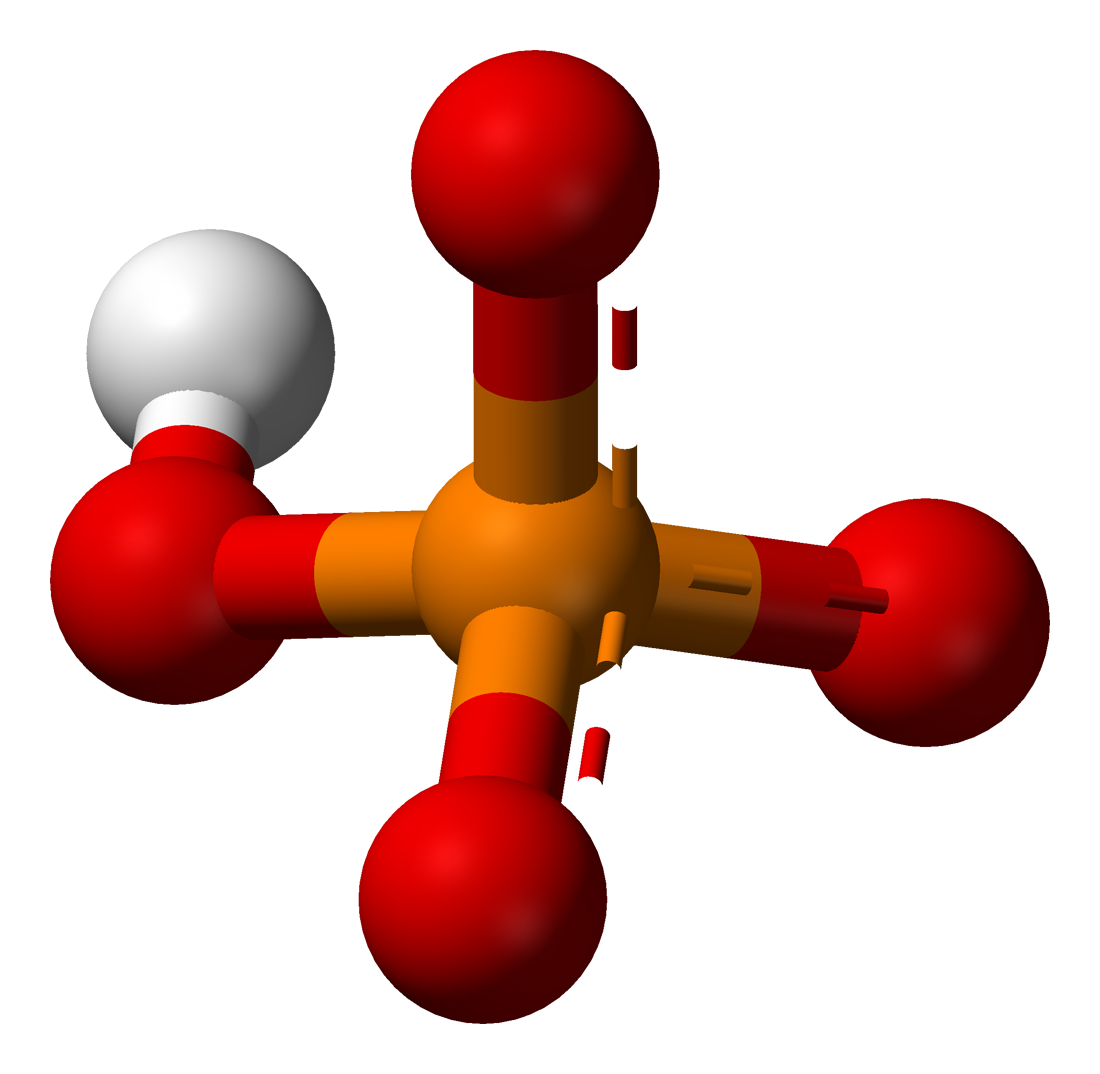
HPO_{4}^{2−}
Hydrogen
phosphate

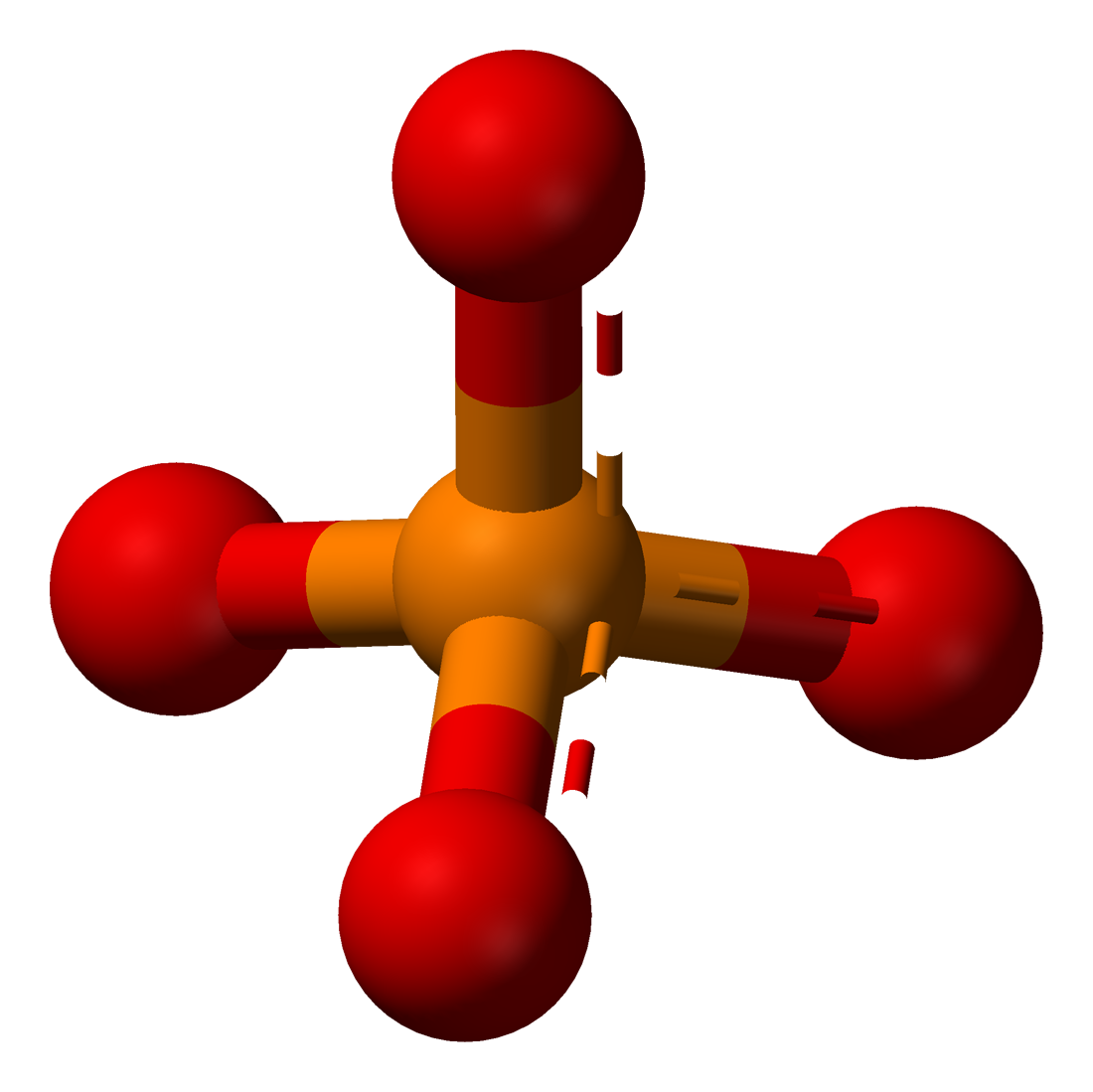
PO_{4}^{3−}
Phosphate or orthophosphate

In organic chemistry, phosphate or orthophosphate is an organophosphate, an ester of orthophosphoric acid of the form PO_{4}RR′R″ where one or more hydrogen atoms are replaced by organic groups. An example is trimethyl phosphate, (CH_{3})_{3}PO_{4}. The term also refers to the trivalent functional group OP(O^{−})_{3} in such esters. Phosphates may contain sulfur in place of one or more oxygen atoms (thiophosphates and organothiophosphates).

Orthophosphates are especially important among the various phosphates because of their key roles in biochemistry, biogeochemistry, and ecology, and their economic importance for agriculture and industry. The addition and removal of phosphate groups (phosphorylation and dephosphorylation) are key steps in cell metabolism. Phosphates are a major component of agricultural fertilizers and play an important role in plant growth. Since phosphates stimulate plant growth, too much phosphate in the environment can cause pollution in the environment and lead to excessive plant growth.

Phosphates are mined around the world for use in agriculture and industry. Mining is a source of heavy metal pollution.

Orthophosphates can condense to form pyrophosphates.

== Chemical properties ==
The phosphate ion has a molar mass of 94.97 g/mol, and consists of a central phosphorus atom surrounded by four oxygen atoms in a tetrahedral arrangement. It is the conjugate base of the hydrogen phosphate ion HPO_{4}^{2−}, which in turn is the conjugate base of the dihydrogen phosphate ion H_{2}PO_{4}^{−}, which in turn is the conjugate base of orthophosphoric acid, H_{3}PO_{4}.

Many phosphates are soluble in water at standard temperature and pressure. The sodium, potassium, rubidium, caesium, and ammonium phosphates are all water-soluble. Most other phosphates are only slightly soluble or are insoluble in water. As a rule, the hydrogen and dihydrogen phosphates are slightly more soluble than the corresponding phosphates.

=== Equilibria in solution ===
Phosphoric acid speciation

In water solution, orthophosphoric acid and its three derived anions coexist according to the dissociation and recombination equilibria below:

Equilibrium	Dissociation constant K_{a}	pK_{a}
H_{3}PO_{4} ⇌ H^{+} + H_{2}PO_{4}^{−}	$K_{a1} = \frac{[\ce{H+}][\ce{H2PO4-}]}{[\ce{H3PO4}]} \approx 7.5 \times 10^{-3}$	pK_{a1} = 2.14
H_{2}PO_{4}^{−} ⇌ H^{+} + HPO_{4}^{2−}	$K_{a2} = \frac{[\ce{H+}][\ce{HPO4^2-}]}{[\ce{H2PO4-}]} \approx 6.2 \times 10^{-8}$	pK_{a2} = 7.20
HPO_{4}^{2−} ⇌ H^{+} + PO_{4}^{3−}	$K_{a3} = \frac{[\ce{H+}][\ce{PO4^3-}]}{[\ce{HPO4^2-}]} \approx 2.14 \times 10^{-13}$	pK_{a3} = 12.37

Values are at 25 °C and 0 ionic strength.

The pK_{a} values are the pH values where the concentration of each species is equal to that of its conjugate bases. At pH 1 or lower, the phosphoric acid is practically undissociated. Around pH 4.7 (mid-way between the first two pK_{a} values) the dihydrogen phosphate ion, H_{2}PO_{4}^{−}, is practically the only species present. Around pH 9.8 (mid-way between the second and third pK_{a} values) the monohydrogen phosphate ion, HPO_{4}^{2−}, is the only species present. At pH 13 or higher, the acid is completely dissociated as the phosphate ion, PO_{4}^{3−}.

This means that salts of the mono- and di-phosphate ions can be selectively crystallised from aqueous solution by setting the pH value to either 4.7 or 9.8.

In effect, H_{3}PO_{4}, H_{2}PO_{4}^{−} and HPO_{4}^{2−} behave as separate weak acids because the successive pK_{a} differ by more than 4.

Phosphate can form many polymeric ions such as pyrophosphate, P_{2}O_{7}^{4−}, and triphosphate, P_{3}O_{10}^{5−}. The various metaphosphate ions (which are usually long linear polymers) have an empirical formula of PO_{3}^{−} and are found in many compounds.

=== Biochemistry of phosphates ===
In biological systems, phosphorus can be found as free phosphate anions in solution (inorganic phosphate) or bound to organic molecules as various organophosphates.

Inorganic phosphate is generally denoted P_{i} and at physiological (homeostatic) pH primarily consists of a mixture of HPO_{4}^{2−} and H_{2}PO_{4}^{−} ions. At a neutral pH, as in the cytosol (pH = 7.0), the concentrations of the orthophosphoric acid and its three anions have the ratios
$$\begin{align}
\frac{[\ce{H2PO4-}]}{[\ce{H3PO4}]} &\approx 7.5 \times 10^4 \\[4pt]
\frac{[\ce{HPO4^2-}]}{[\ce{H2PO4-}]} &\approx 0.62 \\[4pt]
\frac{[\ce{PO4^3-}]}{[\ce{HPO4^2-}]} &\approx 2.14 \times 10^{-6}
\end{align}$$

Thus, only the H_{2}PO_{4}^{−} and HPO_{4}^{2−} ions are present in significant amounts in the cytosol (62% H_{2}PO_{4}^{−}, 38% HPO_{4}^{2−}). In extracellular fluid (pH = 7.4), this proportion is inverted (20% H_{2}PO_{4}^{−}, 80% HPO_{4}^{2−}).

Inorganic phosphate can also be present as pyrophosphate anions P_{2}O_{7}^{4−}, which give orthophosphate by hydrolysis:

P_{2}O_{7}^{4−} + H_{2}O ⇌ 2 HPO_{4}^{2−}

Organic phosphates are commonly found in the form of esters as nucleotides (e.g. AMP, ADP, and ATP) and in DNA and RNA. Free orthophosphate anions can be released by the hydrolysis of the phosphoanhydride bonds in ATP or ADP. These phosphorylation and dephosphorylation reactions are the immediate storage and source of energy for many metabolic processes. ATP and ADP are often referred to as high-energy phosphates, as are the phosphagens in muscle tissue. Similar reactions exist for the other nucleoside diphosphates and triphosphates.

=== Bones and teeth ===
An important occurrence of phosphates in biological systems is as the structural material of bone and teeth. These structures are made of crystalline calcium phosphate in the form of hydroxyapatite. The hard dense enamel of mammalian teeth may contain fluoroapatite, a hydroxy calcium phosphate where some of the hydroxyl groups have been replaced by fluoride ions.

=== Medical and biological research uses ===
Phosphates are medicinal salts of phosphorus. Some phosphates, which help cure many urinary tract infections, are used to make urine more acidic. To avoid the development of calcium stones in the urinary tract, some phosphates are used. For patients who are unable to get enough phosphorus in their daily diet, phosphates are used as dietary supplements, usually because of certain disorders or diseases. Injectable phosphates can only be handled by qualified health care providers.

== Adverse health effects ==
Hyperphosphatemia, or a high blood level of phosphates, is associated with elevated mortality in the general population. The most common cause of hyperphosphatemia in people, dogs, and cats is kidney failure. In cases of hyperphosphatemia, limiting consumption of phosphate-rich foods, such as some meats and dairy items and foods with a high phosphate-to-protein ratio, such as soft drinks, fast food, ultraprocessed foods, condiments, and other products containing phosphate-salt additives is advised.

Phosphates induce vascular calcification, and a high concentration of phosphates in blood was found to be a predictor of cardiovascular events.

== Production ==
=== Geological occurrence ===
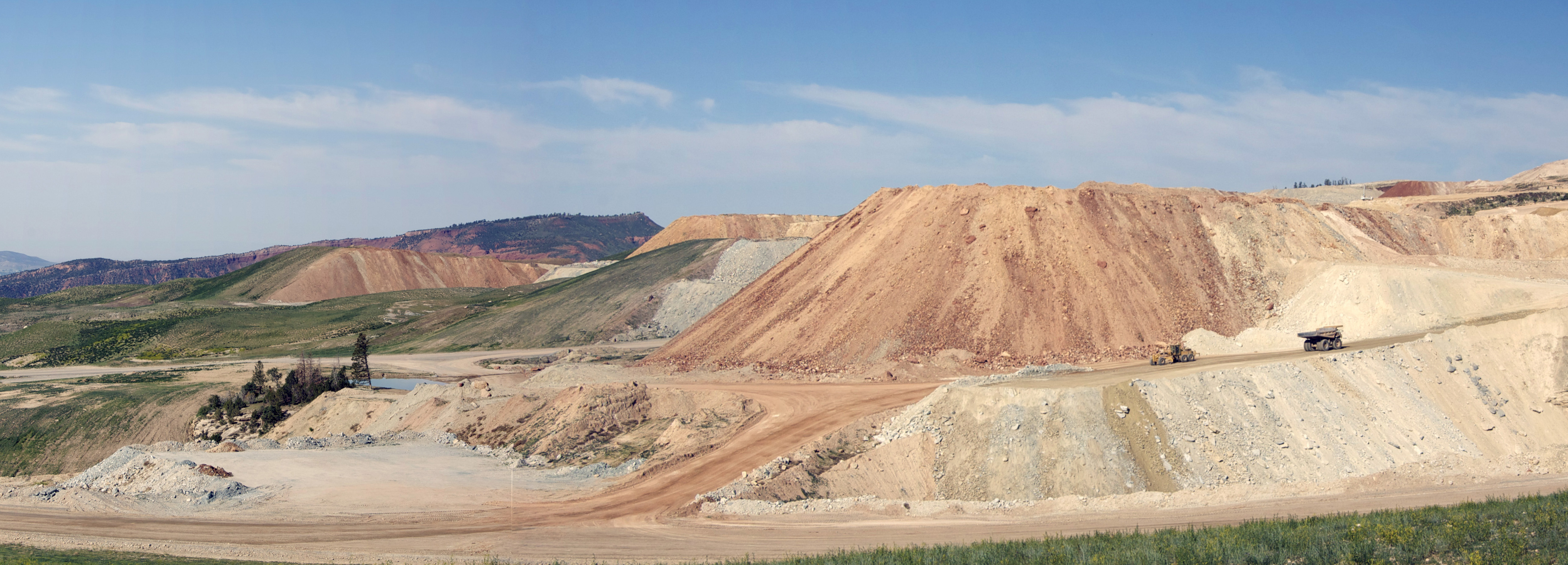
Phosphate mine near Flaming Gorge, Utah, US, 2008

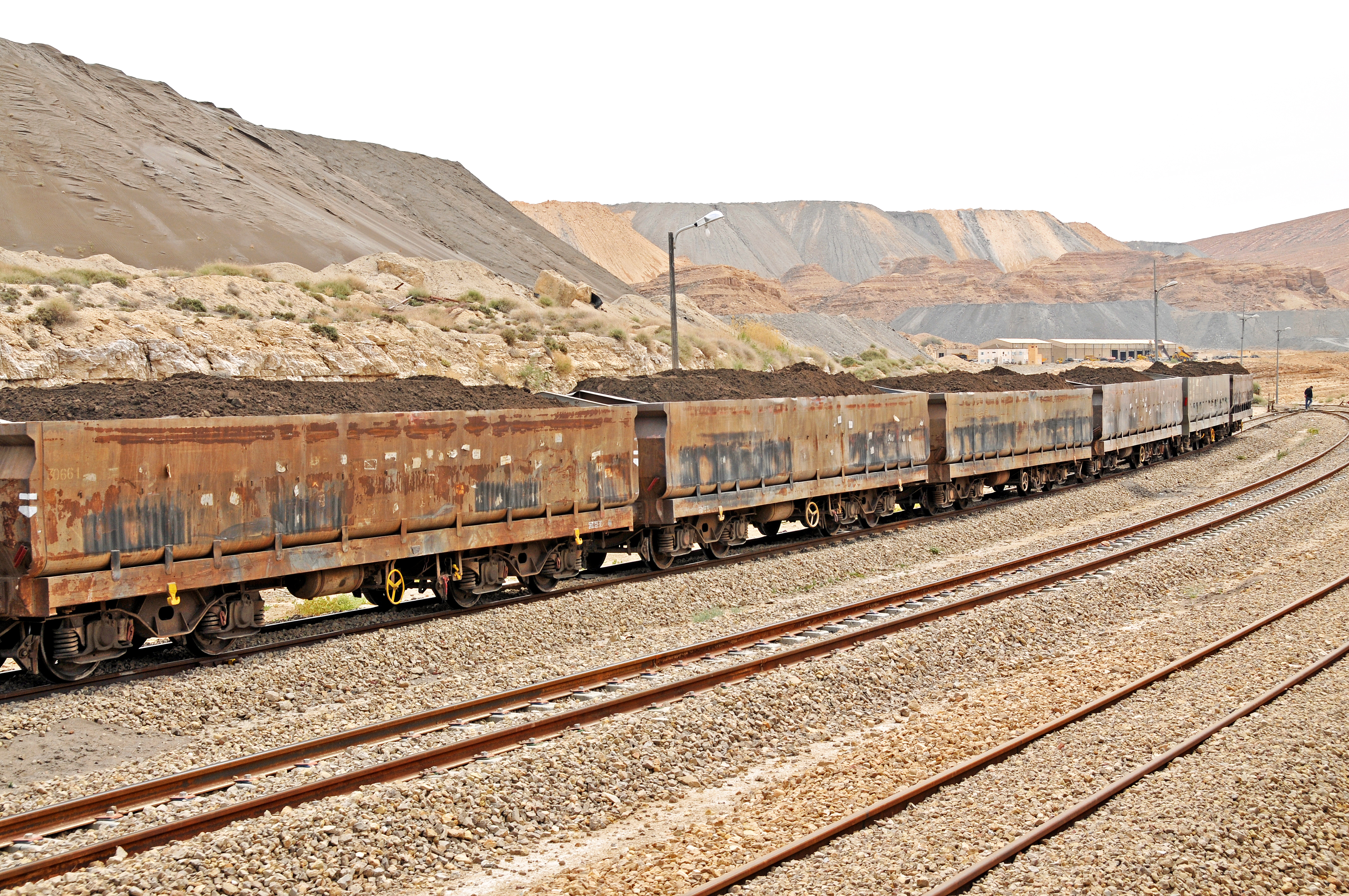
Train loaded with phosphate rock, Métlaoui, Tunisia, 2012

Phosphates are the naturally occurring form of the element phosphorus, found in many phosphate minerals. In mineralogy and geology, phosphate refers to a rock or ore containing phosphate ions. Inorganic phosphates are mined to obtain phosphorus for use in agriculture and industry.

The largest global producer and exporter of phosphates is China, with Morocco possessing the greatest known reserves. Within North America, the largest deposits lie in the Bone Valley region of central Florida, the Soda Springs region of southeastern Idaho, and the coast of North Carolina. Smaller deposits are located in Montana, Tennessee, Georgia, and South Carolina. The small island nation of Nauru and its neighbor Banaba Island, which used to have massive phosphate deposits of the best quality, have been mined excessively. Rock phosphate can also be found in Egypt, Israel, Palestine, Western Sahara, Navassa Island, Tunisia, Togo, and Jordan, countries that have large phosphate-mining industries.

Phosphorite mines are primarily found in:

- North America: United States, especially Florida, with lesser deposits in North Carolina, Idaho, and Tennessee
- Africa: Morocco, Western Sahara, Algeria, Egypt, Niger, Senegal, Togo, Tunisia, Mauritania
- Middle East: Saudi Arabia, Jordan, Israel, Syria, Iran and Iraq, at the town of Akashat, near the Jordanian border.
- Central Asia: Kazakhstan
- Oceania: Australia, Makatea, Nauru, and Banaba Island

In 2007, at the current rate of consumption, the supply of phosphorus was estimated to run out in 345 years. However, some scientists thought that a "peak phosphorus" would occur in 30 years and Dana Cordell from Institute for Sustainable Futures said that at "current rates, reserves will be depleted in the next 50 to 100 years". Reserves refer to the amount assumed recoverable at current market prices. In 2012 the USGS estimated world reserves at 71 billion tons, while 0.19 billion tons were mined globally in 2011. Phosphorus comprises 0.1% by mass of the average rock (while, for perspective, its typical concentration in vegetation is 0.03% to 0.2%), and consequently there are quadrillions of tons of phosphorus in Earth's 3×10^{19}-ton crust, albeit at predominantly lower concentration than the deposits counted as reserves, which are inventoried and cheaper to extract. If it is assumed that the phosphate minerals in phosphate rock are mainly hydroxyapatite and fluoroapatite, phosphate minerals contain roughly 18.5% phosphorus by weight. If phosphate rock contains around 20% of these minerals, the average phosphate rock has roughly 3.7% phosphorus by weight.

Some phosphate rock deposits, such as Mulberry in Florida, are notable for their inclusion of significant quantities of radioactive uranium isotopes. This is a concern because radioactivity can be released into surface waters from application of the resulting phosphate fertilizer.

In December 2012, Cominco Resources announced an updated JORC compliant resource of their Hinda project in Congo-Brazzaville of 531 million tons, making it the largest measured and indicated phosphate deposit in the world.

Around 2018, Norway discovered phosphate deposits almost equal to those in the rest of Earth combined.

In July 2022 China announced quotas on phosphate exportation.

The largest importers in millions of metric tons of phosphate are Brazil 3.2, India 2.9 and the USA 1.6.

=== Mining ===
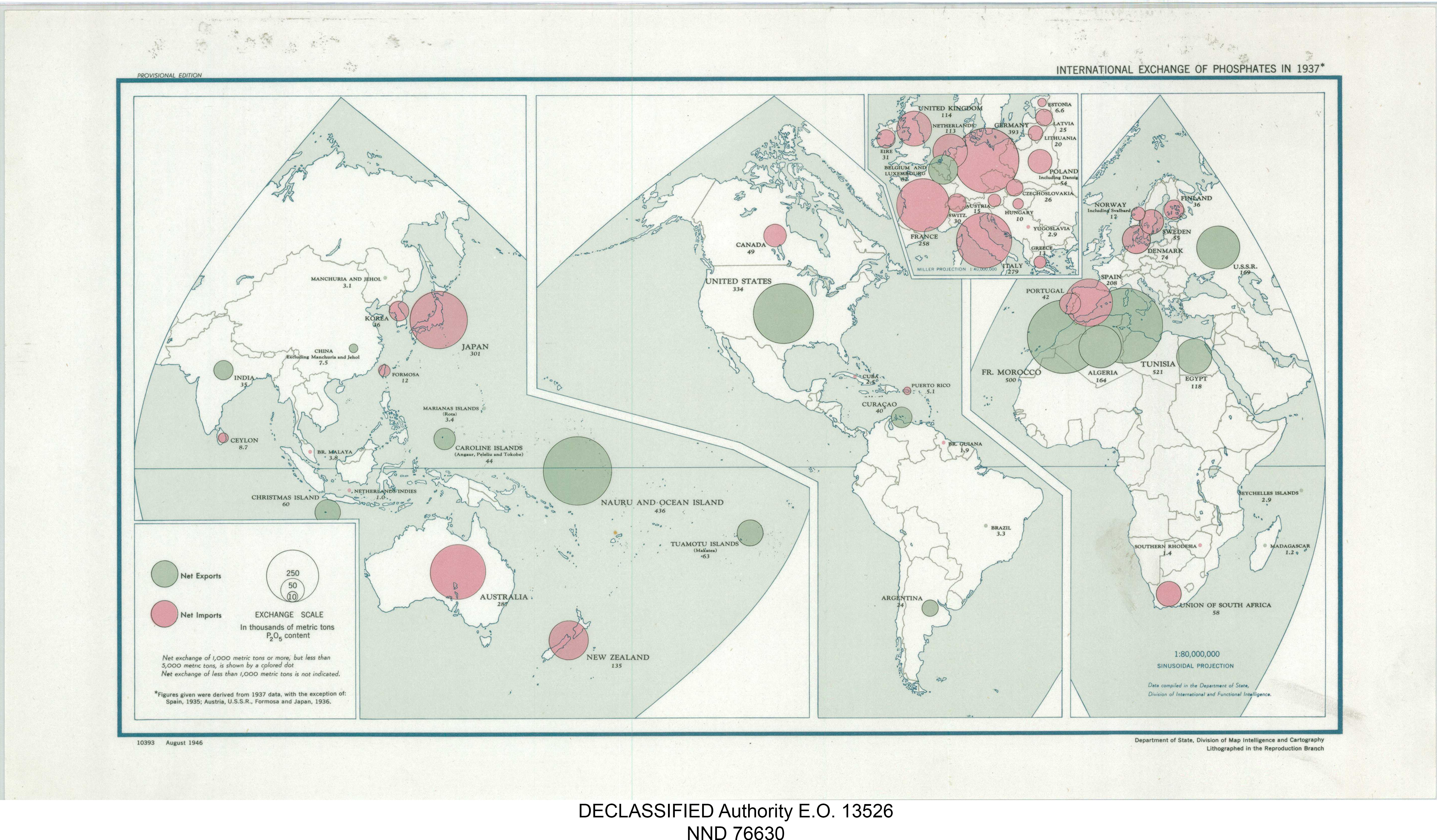
Phosphate imports/exports in 1937

The three principal phosphate producer countries (China, Morocco and the United States) account for about 70% of world production.

Production and global reserves of natural phosphate by country in 2019 (USGS, 2021)
Country	Production (millions kg)	Share of global production (%)	Reserves (millions kg)
Algeria	1,300	0.54	2,200,000
Australia	2,700	1.17	1,100,000
Brazil	4,700	3.00	1,600,000
China	95,000	44.83	3,200,000
Egypt	5,000	2.47	2,800,000
Finland	995	—	1,000,000
India	1,480	0.49	46,000
Iraq	200	0.09	430,000
Israel	2,810	1.48	57,000
Jordan	9,220	3.36	800,000
Kazakhstan	1,500	0.72	260,000
Mexico	558	0.76	30,000
Morocco (WS included)	35,500	13.45	50,000,000
Peru	4,000	1.79	210,000
Russia	13,100	5.60	600,000
Saudi Arabia	6,500	1.48	1,400,000
Senegal	3,420	0.45	50,000
South Africa	2,100	0.99	1,400,000
Syria	2,000	0.34	1,800,000
Togo	800	0.45	30,000
Tunisia	4,110	1.79	100,000
Uzbekistan	900	—	100,000
United States	23,300	12.37	1,000,000
Vietnam	4,650	1.21	30,000
Other countries	1,140	1.17	840,000
Total	227,000	100	71,000,000

==== Environmental Impacts of mining ====
Phosphate deposits can contain significant amounts of naturally occurring heavy metals. Mining operations processing phosphate rock can leave tailings piles containing elevated levels of cadmium, lead, nickel, copper, chromium, and uranium. Unless carefully managed, these waste products can leach heavy metals into groundwater or nearby estuaries. Uptake of these substances by plants and marine life can lead to concentration of toxic heavy metals in food products.

== Ecology ==
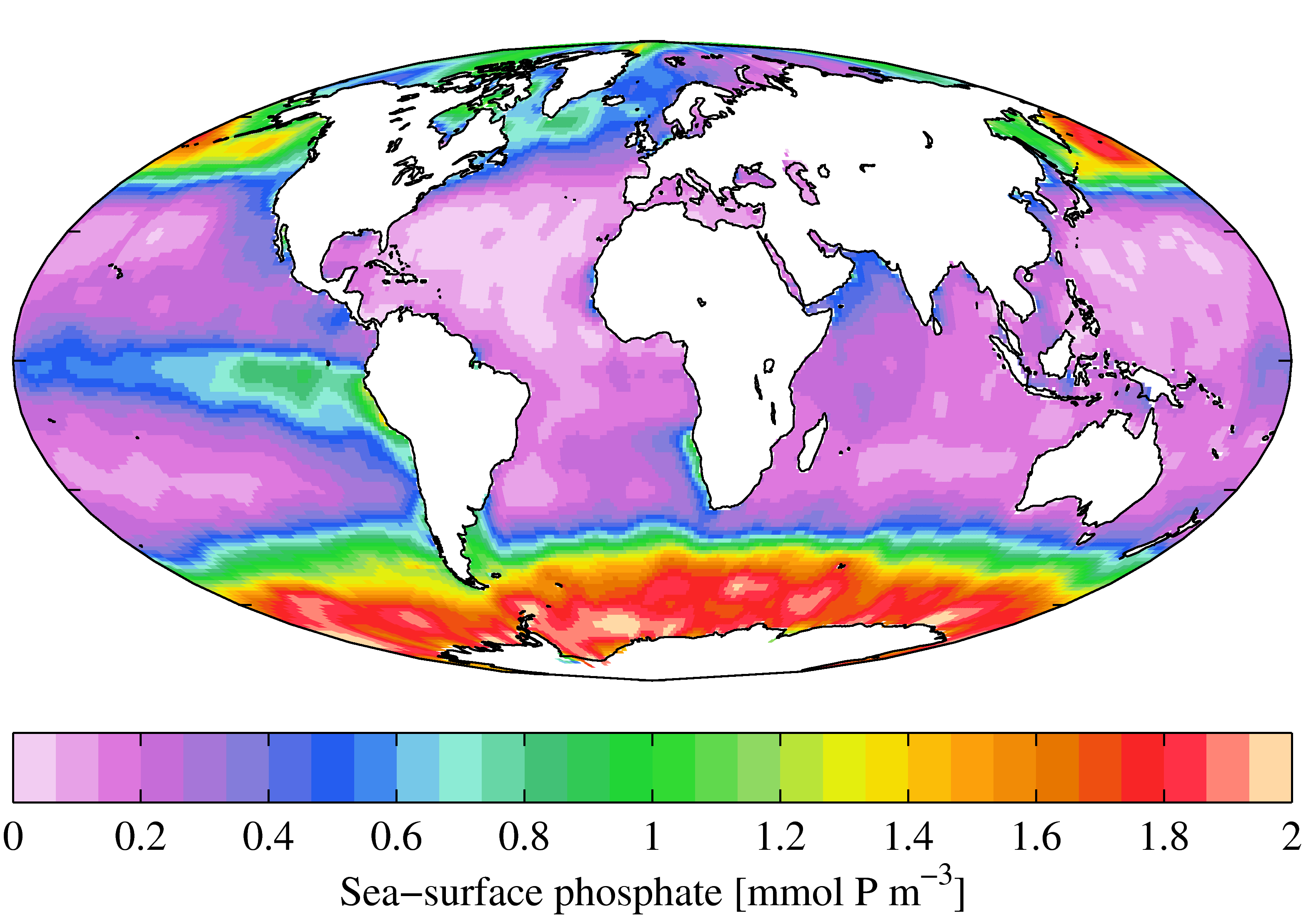
Sea surface phosphate from the World Ocean Atlas

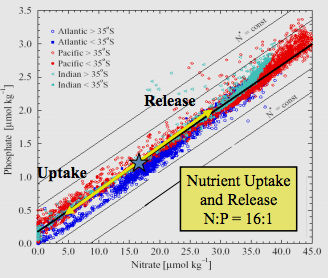
Relationship of phosphate to nitrate uptake for photosynthesis in various regions of the ocean. Note that nitrate is more often limiting than phosphate. See the Redfield ratio.

Phosphorus is a limiting nutrient in many freshwater bodies. Oceans tend to have lower concentrations of phosphorus than freshwaters, but have more factors governing the limiting nutrient. Often, in marine ecosystems, the limiting nutrient is nitrogen rather than phosphorus. Phosphate is the most common form of phosphorus in the environment and is the only form of phosphorus that plants can use.

=== Plant metabolism ===
Phosphorus abundance plays a role in regulating plant growth because phosphorus is part of important molecules including nucleic acids, phospholipids, and ATP. Orthophosphate is the type of phosphorus that is easiest for plants to use, but orthophosphate concentrations in soils are usually low. Plants take up phosphorus through several pathways: the arbuscular mycorrhizal pathway and the direct uptake pathway. In the direct uptake pathway, plants take up phosphate through root hairs, which can decrease phosphate concentrations in the rhizosphere because phosphate does not renew as quickly as plants take it up. Most plants take up phosphate through the arbuscular mycorhizzal path because the fungi can collect phosphate from a larger area.

Plants move phosphate from the roots into the stele, then the xylem, before moving into the shoot where it can be transported where it is needed. Up to 80% of the cellular phosphate is stored in vacuoles, where plants can access it to maintain phosphorus supply for important functions. When leaves or other parts of the plant begin to die, phosphate is moved from the dying part into young leaves or seeds.

=== In soils ===
Calcium hydroxyapatite and calcite precipitates can be found around bacteria in alluvial topsoil. As clay minerals promote biomineralization, the presence of bacteria and clay minerals resulted in calcium hydroxyapatite and calcite precipitates.

Phosphates often adsorb to soil mineral surfaces, mainly Fe- and Al- (oxyhydr)oxides. Goethite is one particularly common and important form of iron for these bonds. High pH can reduce adsorption capacity of these minerals. Phosphate may also adsorb to the edges of clay minerals including kaolinite, montmorillonite, and illite. Soil organic matter competes with phosphates for adsorption sites, so soils with high organic matter content have reduced capacity to adsorb phosphate.

=== Pollution ===
Phosphate is a main component of many fertilizers. After application to agricultural fields, rain may wash excess phosphate into nearby water bodies. Demand for phosphate fertilizers is increasing, likely increasing the impact on water bodies. Other sources of phosphate to the environment include detergent, sewage, and residential fertilizer use. Some countries have created laws regulating phosphate in detergents to reduce the phosphate pollution from detergents (see Phosphates in detergent).

Addition of high levels of phosphate to environments can have significant ecological consequences such as excessive plant growth. In freshwaters, large algal growth can result in depletion of oxygen as bacteria feed on dead algae (see eutrophication). In the context of pollution, phosphates are one component of total dissolved solids, a major indicator of water quality, but not all phosphorus is in a molecular form that algae can break down and consume.

== See also ==
- Diammonium phosphate – (NH_{4})_{2}HPO_{4}
- Disodium phosphate – Na_{2}HPO_{4}
- Metaphosphate – (PO_{3}^{−})
- Monosodium phosphate – NaH_{2}PO_{4}
- Organophosphorus compounds
- Ouled Abdoun Basin
- Phosphate conversion coating
