= Phosphagen =

High energy storage compounds

Phosphagens, also known as macroergic compounds, are high energy storage compounds, also known as high-energy phosphate compounds, chiefly found in muscular tissue in animals. They allow a high-energy phosphate pool to be maintained in a concentration range, which, if it all were adenosine triphosphate (ATP), would create problems due to the ATP-consuming reactions in these tissues. As muscle tissues can have sudden demands for much energy, these compounds can maintain a reserve of high-energy phosphates that can be used as needed, to provide the energy that could not be immediately supplied by glycolysis or oxidative phosphorylation. Phosphagens supply immediate but limited energy.

The actual biomolecule used as a phosphagen is dependent on the organism. The majority of animals use arginine as phosphagen; however, the phylum Chordata (i.e., animals with spinal cords) use creatine. Creatine phosphate (CP), or phosphocreatine (PCr), is made from ATP by the enzyme creatine kinase in a reversible reaction:

- Creatine + ATP ⇌ creatine phosphate + ADP + H^{+} (this reaction is Mg^{2+}-dependent)

However, annelids (segmented worms) use a set of unique phosphagens; for example, earthworms use the compound lombricine.

Phosphagens were discovered by Philip Eggleton and his wife Grace Eggleton.

== Reactions ==
The Phosphagen System (ATP-PCr) occurs in the cytosol (a gel-like substance) of the sarcoplasm of skeletal muscle, and in the myocyte's cytosolic compartment of the cytoplasm of cardiac and smooth muscle.

Creatine kinase reaction

During muscle contraction:

H_{2}O + ATP → H^{+} + ADP + P_{i} (Mg^{2+} assisted, utilization of ATP for Muscle contraction by ATPase)
H^{+} + ADP + CP → ATP + Creatine (Mg^{2+} assisted, catalyzed by creatine kinase, ATP is used again in the above reaction for continued muscle contraction)
2 ADP → ATP + AMP (catalyzed by adenylate kinase/myokinase when CP is depleted, ATP is again used for muscle contraction)

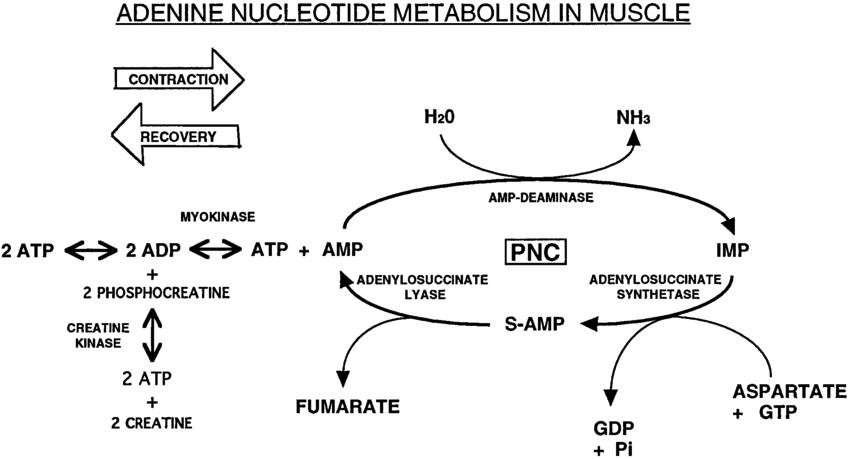
Phosphagen System (ATP-PCr) and Purine Nucleotide Cycle (PNC)

Muscle at rest:

ATP + Creatine → ADP + CP + H^{+} (Mg^{2+} assisted, catalyzed by creatine kinase)
ADP + P_{i} → ATP (during anaerobic glycolysis and oxidative phosphorylation)

When the Phosphagen System has been depleted of phosphocreatine (creatine phosphate), the resulting AMP produced from the adenylate kinase (myokinase) reaction is primarily regulated by the Purine Nucleotide Cycle.
