= Adenosine triphosphate =

Energy-carrying molecule in living cells

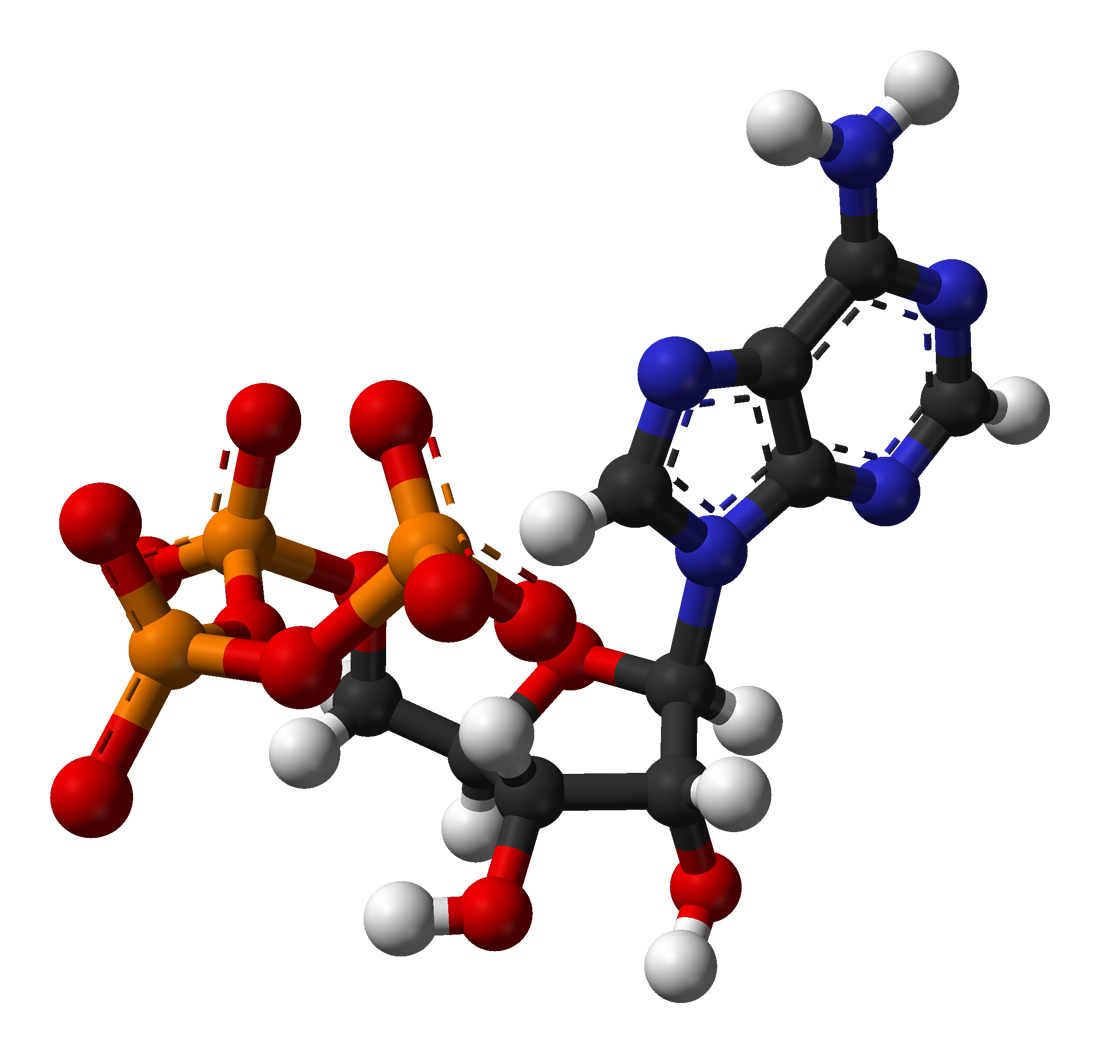

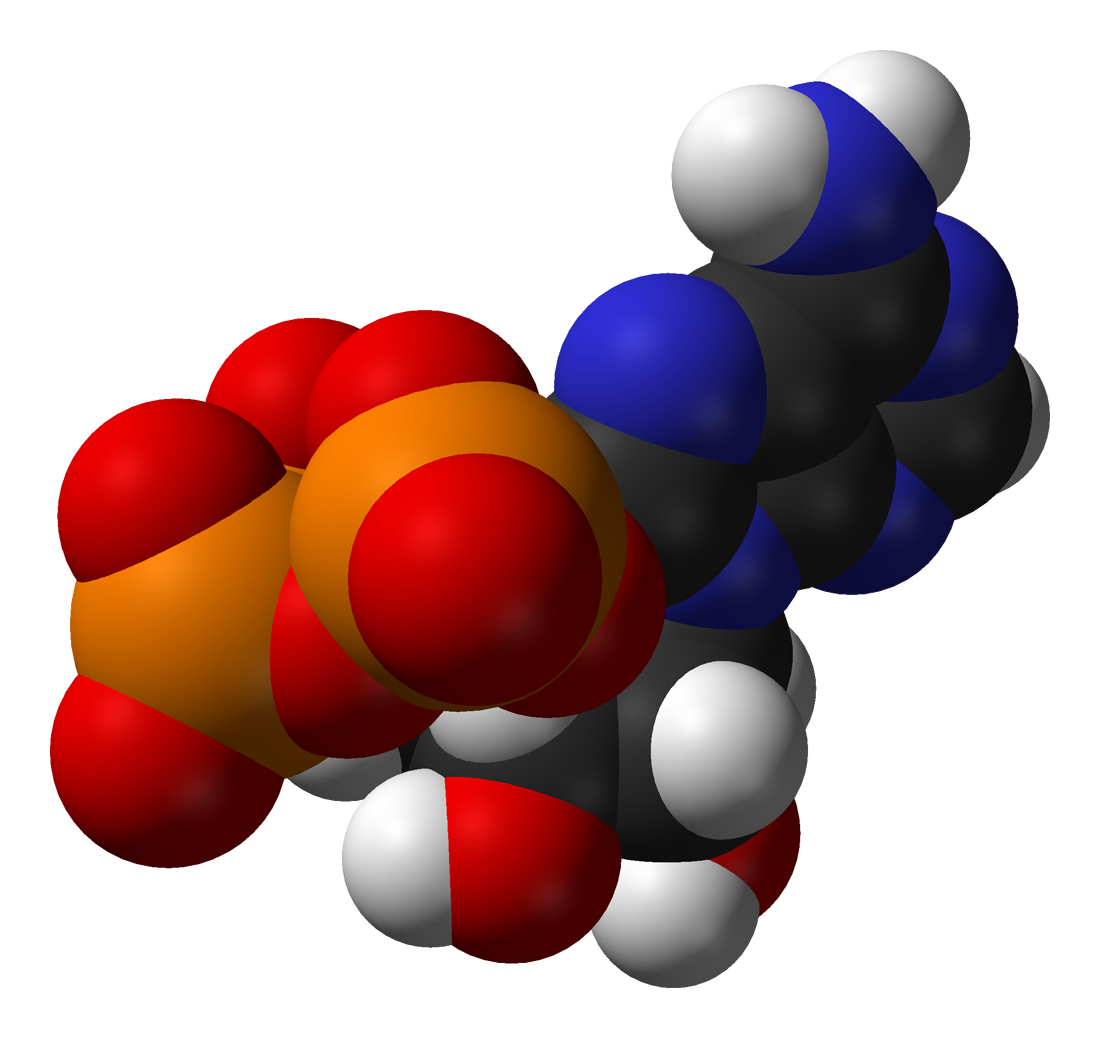

Names
- IUPAC name Adenosine 5′-(tetrahydrogen triphosphate)
- Systematic IUPAC name O^{1}-{[(2R,3S,4R,5R)-5-(6-Amino-9H-purin-9-yl)-3,4-dihydroxyoxolan-2-yl]methyl} tetrahydrogen triphosphate

Identifiers
CAS Number	56-65-5 (free acid); 34369-07-8 (disodium salt hydrate)
3D model (JSmol)	Interactive image; Interactive image
ChEBI	CHEBI:15422
ChEMBL	ChEMBL14249
ChemSpider	5742
DrugBank	DB00171
ECHA InfoCard	100.000.258
IUPHAR/BPS	1713
KEGG	C00002
PubChem CID	5957
UNII	8L70Q75FXE
CompTox Dashboard (EPA)	DTXSID6022559
- InChI: InChI=1S/C10H16N5O13P3/c11-8-5-9(13-2-12-8)15(3-14-5)10-7(17)6(16)4(26-10)1-25-30(21,22)28-31(23,24)27-29(18,19)20/h2-4,6-7,10,16-17H,1H2,(H,21,22)(H,23,24)(H2,11,12,13)(H2,18,19,20)/t4-,6-,7-,10-/m1/s1 Key: ZKHQWZAMYRWXGA-KQYNXXCUSA-N; Key: ZKHQWZAMYRWXGA-KQYNXXCUBG
- SMILES: O=P(O)(O)OP(=O)(O)OP(=O)(O)OC[C@H]3O[C@@H](n2cnc1c(ncnc12)N)[C@H](O)[C@@H]3O; c1nc(c2c(n1)n(cn2)[C@H]3[C@@H]([C@@H]([C@H](O3)COP(=O)(O)OP(=O)(O)OP(=O)(O)O)O)O)N

Properties
Chemical formula	C_{10}H_{16}N_{5}O_{13}P_{3}
Molar mass	507.18 g/mol
Density	1.04 g/cm^{3} (disodium salt)
Melting point	187 °C (369 °F; 460 K) disodium salt; decomposes
Acidity (pK_{a})	0.9, 1.4, 3.8, 6.5
UV-vis (λ_{max})	259 nm
Absorbance	ε_{259} = 15.4 mM^{−1} cm^{−1}
- Except where otherwise noted, data are given for materials in their standard state (at 25 °C [77 °F], 100 kPa). verify (what is ?) Infobox references

Interactive animation of the structure of ATP

Adenosine triphosphate (ATP) is a purine nucleoside triphosphate that provides free energy of approximately 58 kJ/mol (0.6 eV) to drive and support many processes in living cells, such as muscle contraction, nerve impulse propagation, and chemical synthesis. Found in all known forms of life, it is often referred to as the "molecular unit of currency" for intracellular energy transfer.

When consumed in a metabolic process, ATP converts either to adenosine diphosphate (ADP) or to adenosine monophosphate (AMP). Other processes, such as oxidative phosphorylation or substrate-level phosphorylation, regenerate ATP. ATP is also a precursor to DNA and RNA, and is used as a coenzyme. Daily, an average adult human recycles through synthesis and hydrolysis around 50 kilograms of ATP (about 100 moles).

From the perspective of biochemistry, ATP is classified as a nucleoside triphosphate, which indicates that it consists of three components: a nitrogenous base (adenine), the sugar ribose, and the triphosphate.

== Structure ==
ATP consists of three parts: a sugar, an amine base, and a phosphate group. More specifically, ATP consists of an adenine attached by the #9-nitrogen atom to the 1′ carbon atom of a sugar (ribose), which in turn is attached at the 5' carbon atom of the sugar to a triphosphate group. In its many reactions related to metabolism, the adenine and sugar groups remain unchanged, but the triphosphate is converted to di- and monophosphate, giving respectively the derivatives ADP and AMP. The three phosphoryl groups are labeled as alpha (α), beta (β), and, for the terminal phosphate, gamma (γ).

In neutral solution, ionized ATP exists mostly as ATP^{4−}, with a small proportion of ATP^{3−}.

=== Metal cation binding ===
Polyanionic and featuring a potentially chelating polyphosphate group, ATP binds metal cations with high affinity. The binding constant for Mg^{2+} is (9554). The binding of a divalent cation, almost always magnesium, strongly affects the interaction of ATP with various proteins. Due to the strength of the ATP-Mg^{2+} interaction, ATP exists in the cell mostly as a complex with Mg^{2+} bonded to the phosphate oxygen centers.

A second magnesium ion is critical for ATP binding in the kinase domain. The presence of Mg^{2+} regulates kinase activity. It is interesting from an RNA world perspective that ATP can carry a Mg^{2+} ion which catalyzes RNA polymerization.

== Chemical properties ==
Salts of ATP can be isolated as colorless solids.

The cycles of synthesis and degradation of ATP; 2 and 1 represent input and output of energy, respectively.

ATP is stable in aqueous solutions between pH 6.8 and 7.4 (in the absence of catalysts). At more extreme pH levels, it rapidly hydrolyses to ADP and phosphate. Living cells maintain the ratio of ATP to ADP at a point ten orders of magnitude from equilibrium, with ATP concentrations fivefold higher than the concentration of ADP. In the context of biochemical reactions, the P-O-P bonds are frequently referred to as high-energy bonds.

== Reactive aspects ==
The hydrolysis of ATP into ADP and inorganic phosphate:

ATP^{4−} + H_{2}O ⇌ ADP^{3−} + HPO^{2−}_{4} + H^{+}

releases ΔG°' = −30.5 kJ/mol (−7.3 kcal/mol) of Gibbs free energy under standard conditions when all metabolite concentrations are 1 mol/L. This may differ under physiological conditions if the reactant and products are not exactly in these ionization states. The values of the free energy released by cleaving either a phosphate (P_{i}) or a pyrophosphate (PP_{i}) unit from ATP at standard state concentrations of 1 mol/L at pH 7 are:

ATP + H_{2}O → ADP + P_{i} ΔG°' = −30.5 kJ/mol (−7.3 kcal/mol)
ATP + H_{2}O → AMP + PP_{i} ΔG°' = −45.6 kJ/mol (−10.9 kcal/mol)

These abbreviated equations at a pH near 7 can be written more explicitly (R = adenosyl):

[RO−P(O)_{2}−O−P(O)_{2}−O−PO_{3}]^{4−} + H_{2}O → [RO−P(O)_{2}−O−PO_{3}]^{3−} + [HPO_{4}]^{2−} + H^{+}
[RO−P(O)_{2}−O−P(O)_{2}−O−PO_{3}]^{4−} + H_{2}O → [RO−PO_{3}]^{2−} + [HO_{3}P−O−PO_{3}]^{3−} + H^{+}

For ATP hydrolysis that takes place with the physiological concentrations of ATP, ADP, and inorganic phosphate (Pi) within the living cell, the change in Gibbs free energy is given by:

$$\Delta G =\Delta G^{0 '}+RT\ln\left(\frac{[ADP][Pi]}{[ATP]}\right)$$

At cytoplasmic conditions, where the ADP/ATP ratio is 10 orders of magnitude from equilibrium, the ΔG is around −57 kJ/mol.

Along with pH, the free energy change of ATP hydrolysis is also associated with Mg^{2+} concentration, from ΔG°' = −35.7 kJ/mol at a Mg^{2+} concentration of zero, to ΔG°' = −31 kJ/mol at [Mg^{2+}] = 5 mM. Higher concentrations of Mg^{2+} decrease free energy released in the reaction due to binding of Mg^{2+} ions to negatively charged oxygen atoms of ATP at pH 7.

This image shows a 360-degree rotation of a single, gas-phase magnesium-ATP chelate with a charge of −2. The anion was optimized at the UB3LYP/6-311++G(d,p) theoretical level and the atomic connectivity modified by the human optimizer to reflect the probable electronic structure.

== Production from AMP and ADP ==
=== Production, aerobic conditions ===
A typical intracellular concentration of ATP is 1–10 μmol per gram of muscle tissue in a variety of eukaryotes. The dephosphorylation of ATP and rephosphorylation of ADP and AMP occur repeatedly in the course of aerobic metabolism.

ATP can be produced by a number of distinct cellular processes; the three main pathways in eukaryotes are (1) glycolysis, (2) the citric acid cycle/oxidative phosphorylation, and (3) beta-oxidation. The overall process of oxidizing glucose to carbon dioxide, the combination of pathways 1 and 2, known as cellular respiration, produces about 30 equivalents of ATP from each molecule of glucose.

ATP production by a non-photosynthetic aerobic eukaryote occurs mainly in the mitochondria, which comprise nearly 25% of the volume of a typical cell.

==== Glycolysis ====
In glycolysis, glucose and glycerol are metabolized to pyruvate. Glycolysis generates two equivalents of ATP through substrate phosphorylation catalyzed by two enzymes, phosphoglycerate kinase (PGK) and pyruvate kinase. Two equivalents of nicotinamide adenine dinucleotide (NADH) are also produced, which can be oxidized via the electron transport chain and result in the generation of additional ATP by ATP synthase. The pyruvate generated as an end-product of glycolysis is a substrate for the citric acid cycle.

Glycolysis is viewed as consisting of two phases with five steps each. In phase 1, "the preparatory phase", glucose is converted to 2 d-glyceraldehyde-3-phosphate (g3p). One ATP is invested in Step 1, and another ATP is invested in Step 3. Steps 1 and 3 of glycolysis are referred to as "Priming Steps". In Phase 2, two equivalents of g3p are converted to two pyruvates. In Step 7, two ATP are produced. Also, in Step 10, two further equivalents of ATP are produced. In Steps 7 and 10, ATP is generated from ADP. A net of two ATPs is formed in the glycolysis cycle. The glycolysis pathway is later associated with the Citric Acid Cycle, which produces additional equivalents of ATP.

Glycolysis is regulated allosterically by a number of metabolic compounds. For example, hexokinase is directly inhibited by its product, glucose-6-phosphate, and pyruvate kinase is inhibited by ATP itself. The main control point for the glycolytic pathway is phosphofructokinase 1 (PFK1), which is allosterically inhibited by high concentrations of ATP and activated by high concentrations of AMP. The inhibition of PFK1 by ATP is unusual since ATP is also a substrate in the reaction catalyzed by PFK1. The active form of PFK1 enzyme is a tetramer that exists in two conformations, only one of which binds the second substrate fructose-6-phosphate (F6P). The PFK1 enzyme has two binding sites for ATP – the active site is accessible in either protein conformation, but ATP binding to the inhibitor site stabilizes the conformation that binds F6P poorly. A number of other small molecules can compensate for the ATP-induced shift in equilibrium conformation and reactivate PFK1, including cyclic AMP, ammonium ions, inorganic phosphate, fructose 1,6-bisphosphate and fructose 2,6-bisphosphate.

==== Citric acid cycle ====
In the mitochondrion, pyruvate is oxidized by the pyruvate dehydrogenase complex to the acetyl group, which is fully oxidized to carbon dioxide by the citric acid cycle. Every "turn" of the citric acid cycle produces two molecules of carbon dioxide, one equivalent of ATP guanosine triphosphate (GTP) through substrate-level phosphorylation catalyzed by succinyl-CoA synthetase, as succinyl-CoA is converted to succinate, three equivalents of NADH, and one equivalent of FADH_{2}. NADH and FADH_{2} are recycled (to NAD^{+} and FAD, respectively) by oxidative phosphorylation, generating additional ATP. The oxidation of NADH results in the synthesis of 2–3 equivalents of ATP, and the oxidation of one FADH_{2} yields between 1–2 equivalents of ATP. The majority of cellular ATP is generated by this process. Although the citric acid cycle itself does not involve molecular oxygen, it is an obligately aerobic process because O_{2} is used to recycle the NADH and FADH_{2}. In the absence of oxygen, the citric acid cycle ceases.

The generation of ATP by the mitochondrion from cytosolic NADH relies on the malate-aspartate shuttle (and to a lesser extent, the glycerol-phosphate shuttle) because the inner mitochondrial membrane is impermeable to NADH and NAD^{+}. Instead of transferring the generated NADH, a malate dehydrogenase enzyme converts oxaloacetate to malate, which is translocated to the mitochondrial matrix. Another malate dehydrogenase-catalyzed reaction occurs in the opposite direction, producing oxaloacetate and NADH from the newly transported malate and the mitochondrion's interior store of NAD^{+}. A transaminase converts the oxaloacetate to aspartate for transport back across the membrane and into the intermembrane space.

In oxidative phosphorylation, the passage of electrons from NADH and FADH_{2} through the electron transport chain releases the energy to pump protons out of the mitochondrial matrix and into the intermembrane space. This pumping generates a proton motive force that is the net effect of a pH gradient and an electric potential gradient across the inner mitochondrial membrane. Flow of protons down this potential gradient – that is, from the intermembrane space to the matrix – yields ATP by ATP synthase. Three ATP are produced per turn.

Although oxygen consumption appears fundamental for the maintenance of the proton motive force, in the event of oxygen shortage (hypoxia), intracellular acidosis (mediated by enhanced glycolytic rates and ATP hydrolysis), contributes to mitochondrial membrane potential and directly drives ATP synthesis.

Most of the ATP synthesized in the mitochondria will be used for cellular processes in the cytosol; thus it must be exported from its site of synthesis in the mitochondrial matrix. ATP outward movement is favored by the inner mitochondrial membrane's electrochemical potential because the cytosol has a relatively positive charge compared to the relatively negative matrix. For every ATP transported out, it costs 1 H^{+}. Producing one ATP costs about 3 H^{+}. Therefore, making and exporting one ATP requires 4H^{+.} The inner membrane contains an antiporter, the ADP/ATP translocase, which is an integral membrane protein used to exchange newly synthesized ATP in the matrix for ADP in the intermembrane space.

The citric acid cycle is regulated mainly by the availability of key substrates, particularly the ratio of NAD^{+} to NADH and the concentrations of calcium, inorganic phosphate, ATP, ADP, and AMP. Citrate – the ion that gives its name to the cycle – is a feedback inhibitor of citrate synthase and also inhibits PFK, providing a direct link between the regulation of the citric acid cycle and glycolysis.

==== Beta oxidation ====
In the presence of air and various cofactors and enzymes, fatty acids are converted to acetyl-CoA. The pathway is called beta-oxidation. Each cycle of beta-oxidation shortens the fatty acid chain by two carbon atoms and produces one equivalent each of acetyl-CoA, NADH, and FADH_{2}. The acetyl-CoA is metabolized by the citric acid cycle to generate ATP, while the NADH and FADH_{2} are used by oxidative phosphorylation to generate ATP. Dozens of ATP equivalents are generated by the beta-oxidation of a single long acyl chain.

In oxidative phosphorylation, the key control point is the reaction catalyzed by cytochrome c oxidase, which is regulated by the availability of its substrate – the reduced form of cytochrome c. The amount of reduced cytochrome c available is directly related to the amounts of other substrates:

$$\frac12 \ce{NADH} + \ce{cyt}\ \ce{c_{ox}} + \ce{ADP} + \ce{P_{i}} \rightleftharpoons
\frac12 \ce{NAD^+} + \ce{cyt}\ \ce{c_{red}} + \ce{ATP}$$

which directly implies this equation:

$$\frac{[\mathrm{cyt~c_{red}}]}{[\mathrm{cyt~c_{ox}}]} = \left(\frac{[\mathrm{NADH}]}{[\mathrm{NAD}]^{+}}\right)^{\frac{1}{2}}\left(\frac{[\mathrm{ADP}] [\mathrm{P_i}]}{[\mathrm{ATP}]}\right)K_\mathrm{eq}$$

Thus, a high ratio of [NADH] to [NAD^{+}] or a high ratio of [ADP] [P_{i}] to [ATP] imply a high amount of reduced cytochrome c and a high level of cytochrome c oxidase activity. An additional level of regulation is introduced by the transport rates of ATP and NADH between the mitochondrial matrix and the cytoplasm.

==== Ketosis ====
Ketone bodies can be used as fuels, yielding 22 ATP and 2 GTP molecules per acetoacetate molecule when oxidized in the mitochondria. Ketone bodies are transported from the liver to other tissues, where acetoacetate and beta-hydroxybutyrate can be reconverted to acetyl-CoA to produce reducing equivalents (NADH and FADH_{2}), via the citric acid cycle. Ketone bodies cannot be used as fuel by the liver, because the liver lacks the enzyme β-ketoacyl-CoA transferase, also called thiolase. Acetoacetate in low concentrations is taken up by the liver and undergoes detoxification through the methylglyoxal pathway which ends with lactate. Acetoacetate in high concentrations is absorbed by cells other than those in the liver and enters a different pathway via 1,2-propanediol. Though the pathway follows a different series of steps requiring ATP, 1,2-propanediol can be turned into pyruvate.

=== Production, anaerobic conditions ===
Fermentation is the metabolism of organic compounds in the absence of air. It involves substrate-level phosphorylation in the absence of a respiratory electron transport chain.

The equation for the reaction of glucose to form lactic acid is:

C_{6}H_{12}O_{6} + 2 ADP + 2 P_{i} → 2 CH_{3}CH(OH)COOH + 2 ATP + 2 H_{2}O

Anaerobic respiration is respiration in the absence of O_{2}. Prokaryotes can utilize a variety of electron acceptors. These include nitrate, sulfate, and carbon dioxide. In anaerobic organisms and prokaryotes, different pathways result in ATP. ATP is produced in the chloroplasts of green plants in a process similar to oxidative phosphorylation, called photophosphorylation.

==== ATP replenishment by nucleoside diphosphate kinases ====
ATP can also be synthesized through several so-called "replenishment" reactions catalyzed by the enzyme families of nucleoside diphosphate kinases (NDKs), which use other nucleoside triphosphates as a high-energy phosphate donor, and the ATP:guanido-phosphotransferase family.

=== ATP production during photosynthesis ===
In plants, ATP is synthesized in the thylakoid membrane of the chloroplast. The process is called photophosphorylation. The "machinery" is similar to that in mitochondria except that light energy is used to pump protons across a membrane to produce a proton-motive force. ATP synthase then ensues exactly as in oxidative phosphorylation. Some of the ATP produced in the chloroplasts is consumed in the Calvin cycle, which produces triose sugars.

=== ATP recycling ===
The total quantity of ATP in the human body is about 0.1 mol/L. The majority of ATP is recycled from ADP by the aforementioned processes. Thus, at any given time, the total amount of ATP + ADP remains fairly constant.

The energy used by human cells in an adult requires the hydrolysis of 100 to 150 mol/L of ATP daily, which means a human will typically use their body weight worth of ATP over the course of the day. Each equivalent of ATP is recycled 1000–1500 times during a single day (150 / 0.1 = 1500), at approximately 9×10^{20} molecules/s.

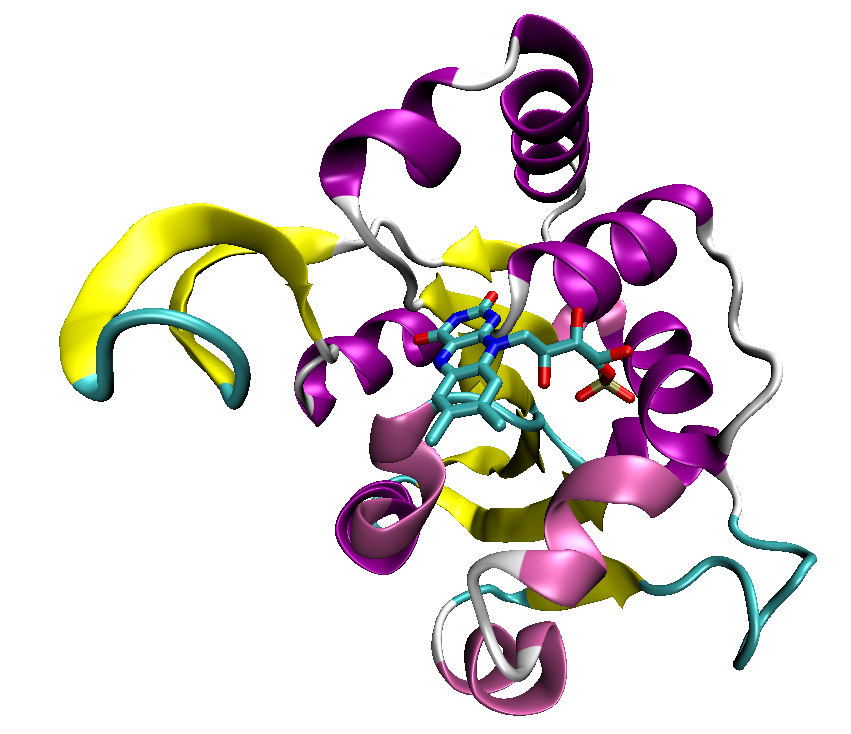
An example of the Rossmann fold, a structural domain of a decarboxylase enzyme from the bacterium Staphylococcus epidermidis (PDB: 1G5Q) with a bound flavin mononucleotide cofactor

== Biochemical functions ==
=== Cellular energy production ===
The conversion of ATP to ADP is the principal mechanism for energy supply in biological processes. Energy is produced in cells when the terminal phosphate group in an ATP molecule is removed from the chain to produce adenosine diphosphate (ADP) when water hydrolyzes ATP:

ATP + H_{2}O → ADP + HPO_{4}^{2-} + H^{+} + energy

However, removing a phosphate group from ADP to produce adenosine monophosphate (AMP) also produces extra energy.

=== Intracellular signaling ===
ATP is involved in signal transduction by serving as substrate for kinases, enzymes that transfer phosphate groups. Kinases are the most common ATP-binding proteins. They share a small number of common folds. Phosphorylation of a protein by a kinase can activate a cascade such as the mitogen-activated protein kinase cascade.

ATP is also a substrate of adenylate cyclase, most commonly in G protein-coupled receptor signal transduction pathways and is transformed to second messenger, cyclic AMP, which is involved in triggering calcium signals by the release of calcium from intracellular stores. This form of signal transduction is particularly important in brain function, although it is involved in the regulation of a multitude of other cellular processes.

=== DNA and RNA synthesis ===
ATP is one of four monomers required in the synthesis of RNA. The process is promoted by RNA polymerases. A similar process occurs in the formation of DNA, except that ATP is first converted to the deoxyribonucleotide dATP. Like many condensation reactions in nature, DNA replication and DNA transcription also consume ATP.

=== Amino acid activation in protein synthesis ===
Aminoacyl-tRNA synthetase enzymes consume ATP in the attachment tRNA to amino acids, forming aminoacyl-tRNA complexes. Aminoacyl transferase binds AMP-amino acid to tRNA. The coupling reaction proceeds in two steps:

1. aa + ATP ⟶ aa-AMP + PP_{i}
2. aa-AMP + tRNA ⟶ aa-tRNA + AMP

The amino acid is coupled to the penultimate nucleotide at the 3′-end of the tRNA (the A in the sequence CCA) via an ester bond (roll over in illustration).

=== ATP binding cassette transporter ===
Transporting chemicals out of a cell against a gradient is often associated with ATP hydrolysis. Transport is mediated by ATP binding cassette transporters. The human genome encodes 48 ABC transporters, that are used for exporting drugs, lipids, and other compounds.

=== Extracellular signalling and neurotransmission ===
Cells secrete ATP to communicate with other cells in a process called purinergic signalling. ATP serves as a neurotransmitter in many parts of the nervous system, modulates ciliary beating, affects vascular oxygen supply etc. ATP is either secreted directly across the cell membrane through channel proteins or is pumped into vesicles which then fuse with the membrane. Cells detect ATP using the purinergic receptor proteins P2X and P2Y. ATP has been shown to be a critically important signalling molecule for microglia - neuron interactions in the adult brain, as well as during brain development. Furthermore, tissue-injury induced ATP-signalling is a major factor in rapid microglial phenotype changes.

=== Muscle contraction ===
ATP fuels muscle contractions. Muscle contractions are regulated by signaling pathways, although different muscle types being regulated by specific pathways and stimuli based on their particular function. However, in all muscle types, contraction is performed by the proteins actin and myosin.

ATP is initially bound to myosin. When ATPase hydrolyzes the bound ATP into ADP and inorganic phosphate, myosin is positioned in a way that it can bind to actin. Myosin bound by ADP and P_{i} forms cross-bridges with actin and the subsequent release of ADP and P_{i} releases energy as the power stroke. The power stroke causes actin filament to slide past the myosin filament, shortening the muscle and causing a contraction. Another ATP molecule can then bind to myosin, releasing it from actin and allowing this process to repeat.

=== Protein solubility and phase separation behavior ===
ATP has recently been proposed to act as a biological hydrotrope and has been shown to affect proteome-wide solubility.Beyond its role as a hydrotrope that modulates protein aggregation, ATP has been discovered to inherently undergo protein-independent liquid–liquid phase separation (LLPS) on its own under macromolecular crowding conditions. The intrinsic ability of ATP to form independent coacervates suggests it may play a direct, structural role in nucleating or regulating membraneless organelles, as well as serving as a primitive route for compartmentalization in prebiotic protocells.

== Abiogenic origins ==
Acetyl phosphate (AcP), a precursor to ATP, can readily be synthesized at modest yields from thioacetate in pH 7 and 20 °C and pH 8 and 50 °C, although acetyl phosphate is less stable in warmer temperatures and alkaline conditions than in cooler and acidic to neutral conditions. It is unable to promote polymerization of ribonucleotides and amino acids and was only capable of phosphorylation of organic compounds. It was shown that it can promote aggregation and stabilization of AMP in the presence of Na^{+}, aggregation of nucleotides could promote polymerization above 75 °C in the absence of Na^{+}. It is possible that polymerization promoted by AcP could occur at mineral surfaces. It was shown that ADP can only be phosphorylated to ATP by AcP and other nucleoside triphosphates were not phosphorylated by AcP. This might explain why all lifeforms use ATP to drive biochemical reactions.

== ATP analogues ==
Biochemistry laboratories often use in vitro studies to explore ATP-dependent molecular processes. ATP analogs are also used in X-ray crystallography to determine a protein structure in complex with ATP, often together with other substrates.

Enzyme inhibitors of ATP-dependent enzymes such as kinases are needed to examine the binding sites and transition states involved in ATP-dependent reactions.

Most useful ATP analogs cannot be hydrolyzed as ATP would be; instead, they trap the enzyme in a structure closely related to the ATP-bound state. Adenosine 5′-(γ-thiotriphosphate) is an extremely common ATP analog in which one of the gamma-phosphate oxygens is replaced by a sulfur atom; this anion is hydrolyzed at a dramatically slower rate than ATP itself and functions as an inhibitor of ATP-dependent processes. In crystallographic studies, hydrolysis transition states are modeled by the bound vanadate ion.

Caution is warranted in interpreting the results of experiments using ATP analogs, since some enzymes can hydrolyze them at appreciable rates at high concentration.

== Medical use ==
ATP is used intravenously for some heart-related conditions.

== History ==
ATP was discovered in 1929 from muscle tissue by Karl Lohmann and Jendrassik and, independently, by Cyrus Fiske and Yellapragada Subba Rao of Harvard Medical School, both teams competing against each other to find an assay for phosphorus.

It was proposed to be the intermediary between energy-yielding and energy-requiring reactions in cells by Fritz Albert Lipmann in 1941. He played a major role in establishing that ATP is the energy currency of a cell.

It was first synthesized in the laboratory by Alexander Todd in 1948, and he was awarded the Nobel Prize in Chemistry in 1957 partly for this work.

The 1978 Nobel Prize in Chemistry was awarded to Peter Dennis Mitchell for the discovery of the chemiosmotic mechanism of ATP synthesis.

The 1997 Nobel Prize in Chemistry was divided, one half jointly to Paul D. Boyer and John E. Walker "for their elucidation of the enzymatic mechanism underlying the synthesis of adenosine triphosphate (ATP)" and the other half to Jens C. Skou "for the first discovery of an ion-transporting enzyme, Na^{+}, K^{+} -ATPase."

== See also ==
- Adenosine-tetraphosphatase
- Adenosine methylene triphosphate
- ATPases
- ATP test
- Creatine
- Cyclic adenosine monophosphate (cAMP)
- Nucleotide exchange factor
- Phosphagen
