= Exercise intolerance =

Inability to perform physical exercise at normal levels

- Other names: Exertion intolerance
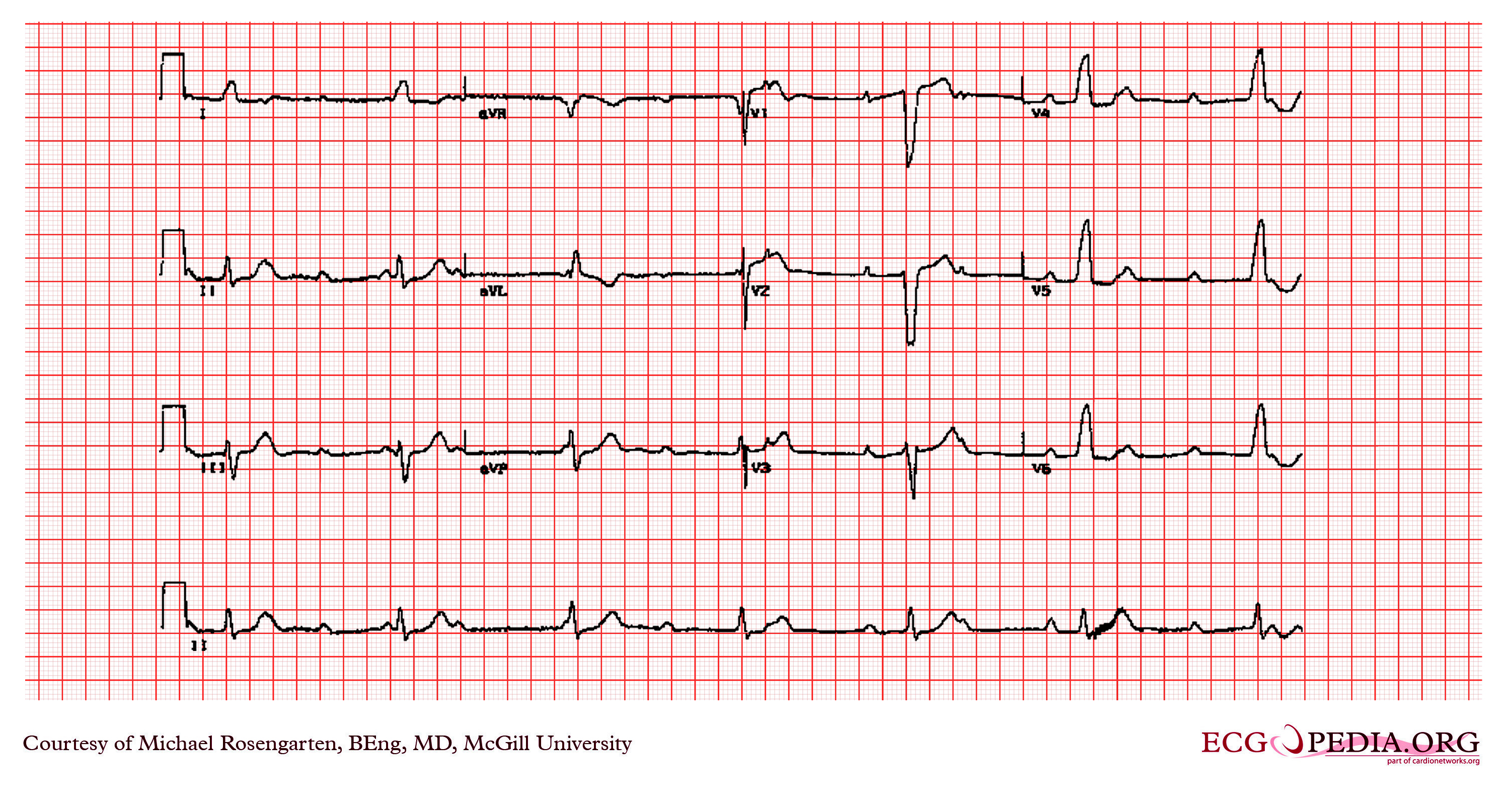
- EKG of a 70-year-old man with exercise intolerance
- Specialty: Cardiology, pulmonology, vascular medicine/vascular surgery/phlebology, rheumatology, orthopedics, neurosurgery, neurology; exercise physiology, physical therapy/physiotherapy
- Symptoms: Dyspnea, chest pain, other pains, fatigue, inappropriate rapid heart rate response to exercise
- Duration: Variable
- Causes: Various
- Risk factors: Multiple, including sedentary lifestyle and low baseline physical activity

Exercise intolerance is a condition of inability or decreased ability to perform physical exercise at the normally expected level or duration for people of that age, size, sex, and muscle mass. It also includes experiences of unusually severe post-exercise pain, fatigue, nausea, vomiting, or other negative effects. Exercise intolerance is not a disease or syndrome in and of itself, but can result from various disorders.

In most cases, the specific reason that exercise is not tolerated is of considerable significance when trying to isolate the cause down to a specific disease. Dysfunctions involving the pulmonary, cardiovascular or neuromuscular systems have been frequently found to be associated with exercise intolerance, with behavioural causes also playing a part.

== Signs and symptoms ==
Exercise in this context means physical activity, not specifically exercise in a fitness program. For example, a person with exercise intolerance after a heart attack may not be able to sustain the amount of physical activity needed to walk through a grocery store or to cook a meal. In a person who does not tolerate exercise well, physical activity may cause unusual breathlessness (dyspnea), muscle pain (myalgia), tachypnoea (abnormally rapid breathing), inappropriate rapid heart rate or tachycardia (having a faster heart rate than normal), increasing muscle weakness or muscle fatigue; or exercise might result in severe headache, nausea, dizziness, occasional muscle cramps or extreme fatigue, which would make it intolerable.

The three most common reasons people give for being unable to tolerate a normal amount of exercise or physical activity are:

- breathlessness – commonly seen in people with lung diseases or heart disease.
- fatigue – when it appears early in an exercise test, it is usually due to deconditioning (either through a sedentary lifestyle or while convalescing from a long illness), but it can indicate heart, lung or neuromuscular diseases.
- pain – potentially due to a variety of medical conditions, such as arthritis, claudication, peripheral vascular disease, or angina. Chronic pain that makes a person unwilling to undertake physical activity is not, by itself, a form of exercise intolerance.

== Causes ==
=== Neurological disorders ===
- Multiple sclerosis

=== Respiratory disorders ===
- Cystic fibrosis: CF can cause skeletal muscle atrophy; however, more commonly it can cause exercise intolerance. The exercise intolerance is associated with reduced pulmonary function that is the origin of CF.
- Bronchiectasis

=== Post-exertional malaise and orthostatic intolerance ===
- Post-exertional malaise (PEM) and exercise intolerance are common symptoms of post-acute infection syndromes. Post-exertional malaise is a worsening of symptoms after minimal physical or mental activity, and is a cardinal symptom of myalgic encephalomyelitis/chronic fatigue syndrome (ME/CFS). Both PEM and exercise intolerance are common in long COVID.
- Orthostatic intolerance (OI) occurs in ME/CFS. OI includes exercise intolerance as one of the main symptoms. It also includes fatigue, nausea, headaches, cognitive problems and visual disturbances as other less major symptoms.

=== Post-concussion syndrome (PCS) ===
- Individuals with postconcussion syndrome may also experience a level of exercise intolerance; however, there is little known comparatively about exercise intolerance in PCS patients.

=== Heart conditions ===
- Angina pectoris
- Heart failure: exercise intolerance is a primary symptom of chronic diastolic heart failure.
- Cardiac arrhythmia
- Aortic valve insufficiency
- Pulmonary artery hypertension: PAH has the following symptoms – dyspnea and fatigue, these systems consequently contribute to exercise intolerance.
- Asymptomatic atrial septal defects: in the heart the right ventricular (RV) can have a volume overload which ultimately produces a pressure overload in the RV resulting in exercise intolerance as the RV is no longer able to control high pressure associated with exercise.
- Chronic heart failure
- Inappropriate sinus tachycardia
- Postural orthostatic tachycardia syndrome

=== Musculoskeletal disorders ===
- Spinal muscular atrophy: symptoms include exercise intolerance, cognitive impairment and fatigue.
- Rhabdomyolysis: a condition in which muscle degrades, releasing intracellular muscle content into the blood as reflected by elevated blood levels of creatine kinase. Exercise tolerance is significantly compromised.

=== Low ATP reservoir in muscles (inherited or acquired) ===
- Exercise tolerance reflects the combined capacity of components in the oxygen cascade to supply adequate oxygen for ATP resynthesis by oxidative phosphorylation. In individuals with diseases such as cancer, certain therapies can affect one or more components of this cascade and therefore reduce the body's ability to utilise or deliver oxygen, leading to temporary exercise intolerance.
- Abnormal thyroid function can cause hyperthyroid myopathy and hypothyroid myopathy by affecting myocardial oxygen function. Both include symptoms of muscle fatigue and muscle pain, with dyspnea (shortness of breath) presenting in hyperthyroid myopathy. Thyroxine (T4) deficiency leads to a reduced mitochondrial oxidative capacity, abnormal glycogenolysis and an insulin resistant state of the cell. Hypothyroid myopathy includes Kocher-Debre-Semelaigne syndrome (childhood-onset) and Hoffmann syndrome (adult-onset).

==== Metabolic myopathy ====
Metabolic myopathies are inherited inborn errors of metabolism that affect the ability of the muscle to produce ATP, either aerobically (cellular respiration) or anaerobically (glycolysis and lactic acid fermentation). The common symptom that they share is exercise intolerance, due to the low ATP reservoir within muscle cells. Depending on the enzymatic or transport protein defect, symptoms may show only upon exertion or both at rest and upon exertion. Metabolic myopathies are further categorized by the system that they affect: inborn errors of carbohydrate metabolism (including muscle GSDs), inborn errors of lipid metabolism (fatty acid metabolism disorder), inborn error of purine–pyrimidine metabolism (such as AMP deaminase deficiency), and those involving enzymes or transport proteins within the mitochondrion (mitochondrial myopathies and disorders of citric acid cycle and electron transport chain). (See metabolic myopathies for more details.)

- Mitochondrial complex III: One of the metabolic myopathies, currently it is suggested that there are 27 different mutations identified in cytochrome b (mitochondrial complex III is one of those mutations). This mutation can often lead to skeletal muscle weakness and as a result exercise intolerance.
- A complex of Coenzyme Q10: One of the metabolic myopathies, Coenzyme Q10 deficiency includes the symptom of exertional fatigue.
- Skeletal muscle respiratory chain defect (electron transport chain [ETC]): A type of metabolic myopathy, this can result in severe exercise intolerance which is manifested by the following symptoms of skeletal muscle respiratory chain defect; muscle fatigue and lactic acidosis.
- Riboflavin-responsive exercise intolerance caused by mutations of the SLC25A32 gene
- Glycogen storage disease type V, one of the metabolic myopathies, is caused by mutations of the gene encoding myophosphorylase.

===== Cytochrome b mutations =====
Mutations of the protein Cytochrome b directly affect the fabrication and function of mitochondrial complex III, and can frequently cause isolated exercise intolerance and myopathy, and, in some cases, multisystem disorders.

=== Intracranial hypertension ===
Individuals with elevated levels of cerebrospinal fluid can experience increased head pain, throbbing, pulsatile tinnitus, nausea and vomiting, faintness and weakness and even loss of consciousness after exercise or exertion.

== Diagnosis ==
Objective tests for exercise intolerance normally involve performing some exercise. Common tests include stair climbing, walking for six minutes, a shuttle-walk test, a cardiac stress test, and the cardiopulmonary exercise test (CPET). In the six-minute walk test, the goal is to see how far the person can walk, with approximately 600 meters being a reasonable outcome for an average person without exercise intolerance. The CPET test measures exercise capacity and help determine whether the cause of exercise intolerance is due to heart disease or to other causes. People who experience significant fatigue before reaching the anaerobic threshold usually have a non-cardiac cause for exercise intolerance.

Additionally, testing for exercise-induced asthma may be appropriate.

== Treatment ==
In individuals with heart failure and normal EF (ejection fraction), including aortic distensibility, blood pressure, LV diastolic compliance and skeletal muscle function, aerobic exercise has the potential to improve exercise tolerance. A variety of pharmacological interventions such as verapamil, enalapril, angiotensin receptor antagonism, and aldosterone antagonism could potentially improve exercise tolerance in these individuals as well.

Research studies on individuals with chronic obstructive pulmonary disease (COPD) have found a number of effective therapies in relation to exercise intolerance. These include:

1. Oxygen supplementation
  - Reduces carotid body drive and slows respiration at a given level of exercise.
2. Treatment with bronchodilators
  - Clinically useful improvements in expiratory airflow, allows fuller exhalation in a given period of time, reduces dynamic hyperinflation, and prolongs exercise tolerance.
3. Heliox (79% helium, 21% oxygen)
  - Heliox has a lower density than air.
  - Breathing heliox lowers expiratory airflow resistance, decreases dynamic hyperinflation, and prolongs exercise tolerance.
4. High intensity rehabilitative exercise training
  - Increasing the fitness of muscles decreases the amount of lactic acid released at any given level of exercise.
  - Since lactic acid stimulates respiration, after rehabilitative training exercising, ventilation is lower, respiration is slowed, and dynamic hyperinflation is reduced.

It has been shown that a combination of these therapies may potentially improve exercise tolerance.

=== Hazards ===
Certain conditions exist where exercise may be contraindicated or should be performed under the direction of a licensed medical professional acting within their scope of practice. These conditions include, but are not limited to:

- Decompensated heart failure
- Recent myocardial infarction
- Hypertrophic cardiomyopathy or cardiomyopathy from recent myocarditis
- Active or suspected myocarditis or pericarditis
- Low left-ventricular ejection fraction (LVEF)
- Severe aortic stenosis
- Unstable ischemia
- Unstable arrhythmia
- Irregular or resting pulse greater than 100 bpm
- Resting systolic blood pressure >200 mm Hg or resting diastolic blood pressure >110 mm Hg
- Severe pulmonary hypertension
- Chronic fatigue syndrome
- Suspected or known dissecting aortic aneurysm
- Recent systemic or pulmonary embolus
- Pneumothorax and haemoptysis
- Thrombophlebitis

Although it has not been shown to promote improved muscle strength, passive range-of-motion exercise is sometimes used to prevent skin breakdown and prevent contractures in patients who are unable to safely self-power.

== See also ==
- Frailty syndrome
- Heat intolerance
- Post-exertional malaise
