= Fumarate lyase =

Lyase

Identifiers
- Symbol: Lyase_1
- Pfam: PF00206
- InterPro: IPR000362
- PROSITE: PDOC00147
- SCOP2: 1jsw / SCOPe / SUPFAM
- CDD: cd01362
Available protein structures:
- PDB: 1yisA:13-309 1re5A:8-300 1q5nA:90-301 1dofB:88-286 1c3uB:3-286 1c3cA:3-286 1tj7B:6-301 1k62B:11-305 1aosB:20-305 1i0aA:11-305 1u15B:11-305 1u16A:11-305 1hy0A:11-305 1xwoB:11-305 1k7wA:13-307 1tjvB:13-307 1tjuA:13-307 1hy1B:13-307 1tjwA:13-307 1auwA:19-307 1jswA:13-345 1j3uB:13-342 1yfm :36-367 1kq7B:12-342 1yfeA:12-342 1fupA:12-342 1furB:12-342 2fusA:12-342 1fuqB:12-342 1fuoB:12-342 1vdkB:11-342 IPR000362 PF00206 (ECOD; PDBsum)
- AlphaFold: IPR000362; PF00206

Fumarate lyase belongs to the lyase class of enzymes. These proteins use fumarate as a substrate. They have been shown to share a short conserved sequence around a methionine which is probably involved in the catalytic activity of this type of enzymes.

The following are examples of members of this family:

- 3-carboxymuconate lactonizing enzyme, EC 5.5.1.2 (3-carboxy-cis,cis-muconate cycloisomerase), an enzyme involved in aromatic acids catabolism.
- Delta-crystallin shares around 90% sequence identity with arginosuccinate lyase, showing that it is an example of a 'hijacked' enzyme - accumulated mutations have, however, rendered the protein enzymatically inactive.
- Class I Fumarase enzyme, EC 4.2.1.2 (fumarate hydratase), which catalyzes the reversible hydration of fumarate to L-malate. Class I enzymes are thermolabile dimeric enzymes (as for example: Escherichia coli fumA and fumB).
- Arginosuccinase, EC 4.3.2.1 (argininosuccinate lyase), which catalyzes the formation of arginine and fumarate from argininosuccinate, the last step in the biosynthesis of arginine.
- Aspartate ammonia-lyase, EC 4.3.1.1 (aspartase), which catalyzes the reversible conversion of aspartate to fumarate and ammonia. This reaction is analogous to that catalyzed by fumarase, except that ammonia rather than water is involved in the trans-elimination reaction.
- class II Fumarase enzyme, EC 4.2.1.2, are thermostable and tetrameric and are found in prokaryotes (as for example: Escherichia coli fumC) as well as in eukaryotes. The sequence of the two classes of fumarases are not closely related.
- Adenylosuccinase, EC 4.3.2.2 (adenylosuccinate lyase), which catalyzes the eighth step in the de novo biosynthesis of purines, the formation of 5'-phosphoribosyl-5-amino-4-imidazolecarboxamide and fumarate from 1-(5- phosphoribosyl)-4-(N-succino-carboxamide). That enzyme can also catalyze the formation of fumarate and AMP from adenylosuccinate.
