= Bioenergetic systems =

Metabolic processes for energy production

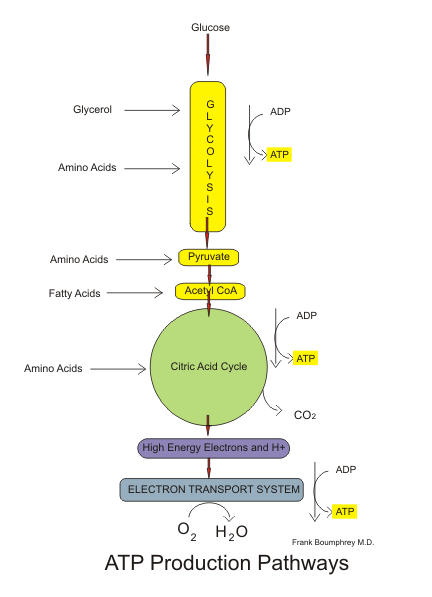
Simplified outline of the catabolism of carbohydrates, fatty acids, and amino acids in the synthesis of ATP

Bioenergetic systems are metabolic processes that relate to the flow of energy in living organisms. Those processes convert energy into adenosine triphosphate (ATP), which is the form suitable for muscular activity. There are two main forms of synthesis of ATP: aerobic, which uses oxygen from the bloodstream, and anaerobic, which does not. Bioenergetics is the field of biology that studies bioenergetic systems.

== Overview ==
The process that converts the chemical energy of food into ATP (which can release energy) is not dependent on oxygen availability. During exercise, the supply and demand of oxygen available to muscle cells is affected by duration and intensity and by the individual's cardio respiratory fitness level. It is also affected by the type of activity, for instance, during isometric activity the contracted muscles restricts blood flow (leaving oxygen and blood borne fuels unable to be delivered to muscle cells adequately for oxidative phosphorylation). Three systems can be selectively recruited, depending on the amount of oxygen available, as part of the cellular respiration process to generate ATP for the muscles. They are ATP, the anaerobic system and the aerobic system.

== Adenosine triphosphate ==
ATP is the only type of usable form of chemical energy for musculoskeletal activity. It is stored in most cells, particularly in muscle cells. Other forms of chemical energy, such as those available from oxygen and food, must be transformed into ATP before they can be utilized by the muscle cells.

== Coupled reactions ==
Since energy is released when ATP is broken down, energy is required to rebuild or resynthesize it. The building blocks of ATP synthesis are the by-products of its breakdown; adenosine diphosphate (ADP) and inorganic phosphate (P_{i}). The energy for ATP resynthesis comes from three different series of chemical reactions that take place within the body. Two of the three depend upon the food eaten, whereas the other depends upon a chemical compound called phosphocreatine. The energy released from any of these three series of reactions is utilized in reactions that resynthesize ATP. The separate reactions are functionally linked in such a way that the energy released by one is used by the other.

Three processes can synthesize ATP:

- ATP–CP system (phosphagen system) – At maximum intensity, this system is used for up to 10–15 seconds. The ATP–CP system neither uses oxygen nor produces lactic acid if oxygen is unavailable and is thus called alactic anaerobic. This is the primary system behind very short, powerful movements like a golf swing, a 100 m sprint or powerlifting.
- Anaerobic system – This system predominates in supplying energy for intense exercise lasting less than two minutes. It is also known as the glycolytic system. An example of an activity of the intensity and duration that this system works under would be a 400 m sprint.
- Aerobic system – This is the long-duration energy system. After five minutes of exercise, the O_{2} system is dominant. In a 1 km run, this system is already providing approximately half the energy; in a marathon run it provides 98% or more. Around mile 20 of a marathon, runners typically "hit the wall," having depleted their glycogen reserves they then attain "second wind" which is entirely aerobic metabolism primarily by free fatty acids.

Relative contribution of ATP production of bioenergetic systems during aerobic exercise at maximum intensity (e.g. sprinting)

Aerobic and anaerobic systems usually work concurrently. When describing activity, it is not a question of which energy system is working, but which predominates.

Exercise intensity (%W_{max}) and substrate use in muscle during aerobic activity (cycling)
		Exercise intensity (W_{Max})			
		At rest	40%W_{max} Very low-intensity	55%W_{max} Low-intensity	75%W_{max} Moderate-intensity
Percent of substrate contribution to total energy expenditure	Plasma glucose	44%	10%	13%	18%
Percent of substrate contribution to total energy expenditure	Muscle glycogen	-	35%	38%	58%
Percent of substrate contribution to total energy expenditure	Plasma free fatty acids	56%	31%	25%	15%
Percent of substrate contribution to total energy expenditure	Other fat sources (intramuscular and lipoprotein-derived triglycerides)	-	24%	24%	9%
Percent of substrate contribution to total energy expenditure	Total	100%	100%	100%	100%
Total energy expenditure (kJ min^{−1})		10	50	65	85

== Anaerobic and aerobic metabolism ==
The term metabolism refers to the various series of chemical reactions that take place within the body. Aerobic refers to the presence of oxygen, whereas anaerobic means with a series of chemical reactions that does not require the presence of oxygen. The ATP-CP series and the lactic acid series are anaerobic, whereas the oxygen series is aerobic.

== Anaerobic metabolism ==
=== ATP–CP: the phosphagen system ===
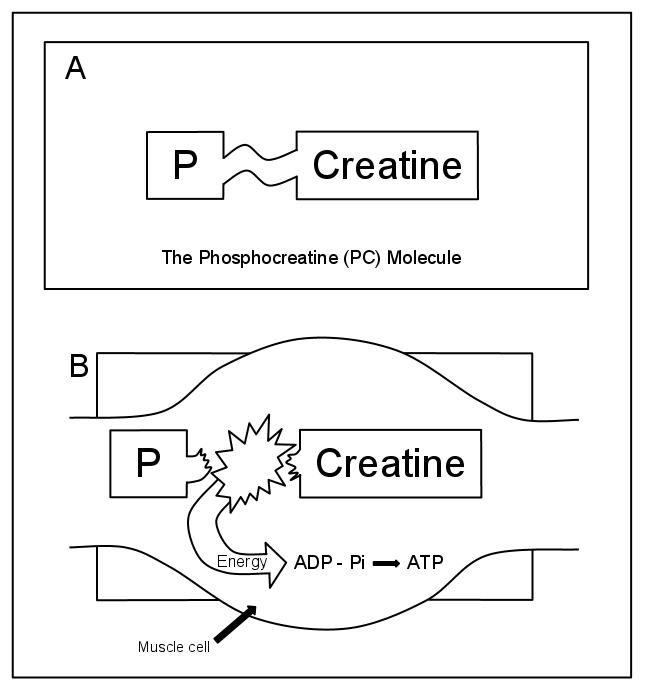
(A) Phosphocreatine, which is stored in muscle cells, contains a high energy bond. (B) When creatine phosphate is broken down during muscular contraction, energy is released and utilized to resynthesize ATP.

Creatine phosphate (CP), like ATP, is stored in muscle cells. When it is broken down, a considerable amount of energy is released. The energy released is coupled to the energy requirement necessary for the resynthesis of ATP.

The total muscular stores of both ATP and CP are small. Thus, the amount of energy obtainable through this system is limited. The phosphagen stored in the working muscles is typically exhausted in seconds of vigorous activity. However, the usefulness of the ATP-CP system lies in the rapid availability of energy rather than quantity. This is important with respect to the kinds of physical activities that humans are capable of performing.

The phosphagen system (ATP-PCr) occurs in the cytosol (a gel-like substance) of the sarcoplasm of skeletal muscle, and in the myocyte's cytosolic compartment of the cytoplasm of cardiac and smooth muscle.

During muscle contraction:

Creatine kinase reaction

H_{2}O + ATP → H^{+} + ADP + P_{i} (Mg^{2+} assisted, utilization of ATP for muscle contraction by ATPase)
H^{+} + ADP + CP → ATP + Creatine (Mg^{2+} assisted, catalyzed by creatine kinase, ATP is used again in the above reaction for continued muscle contraction)
2 ADP → ATP + AMP (catalyzed by adenylate kinase/myokinase when CP is depleted, ATP is again used for muscle contraction)

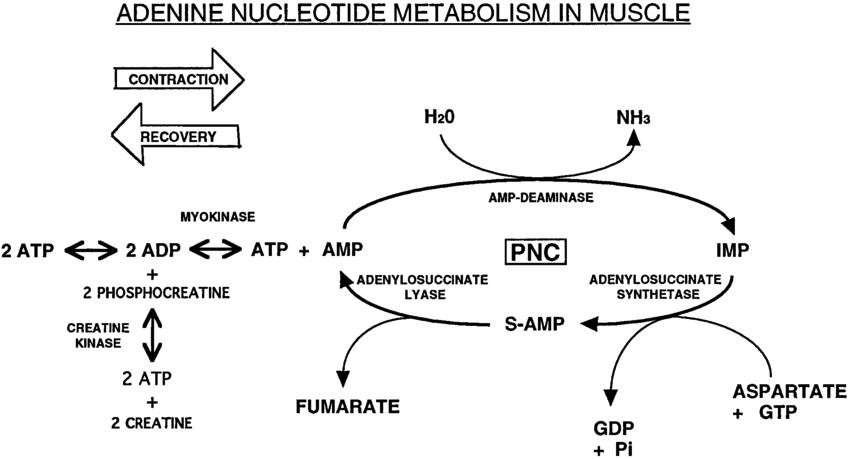
Phosphagen system (ATP-PCr) and purine nucleotide cycle (PNC)

Muscle at rest:

ATP + Creatine → H^{+} + ADP + CP (Mg^{2+} assisted, catalyzed by creatine kinase)
ADP + P_{i} → ATP (during anaerobic glycolysis and oxidative phosphorylation)

When the phosphagen system has been depleted of phosphocreatine (creatine phosphate), the resulting AMP produced from the adenylate kinase (myokinase) reaction is primarily regulated by the purine nucleotide cycle.

=== Anaerobic glycolysis ===
The conversion of pyruvate into lactate produces NAD+ to keep glycolysis going.

This system is known as anaerobic glycolysis. "Glycolysis" refers to the breakdown of sugar. In this system, the breakdown of sugar supplies the necessary energy from which ATP is manufactured. When sugar is metabolized anaerobically, it is only partially broken down and one of the byproducts is lactic acid. This process creates enough energy to couple with the energy requirements to resynthesize ATP.

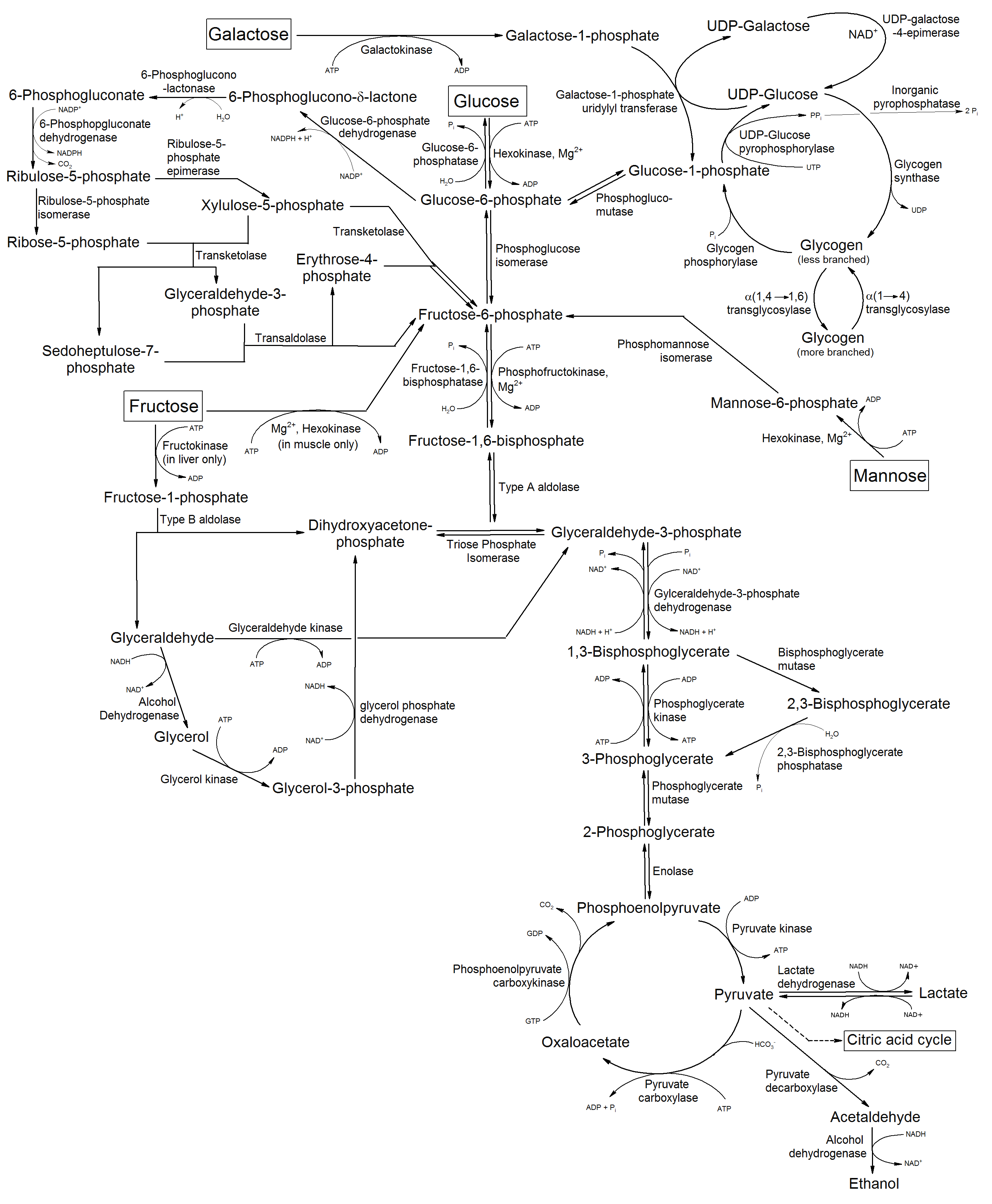
How common monosaccharides (simple sugars) such as glucose, fructose, galactose, and mannose enter the glycolytic pathway

When H^{+} ions accumulate in the muscles causing the blood pH level to reach low levels, temporary muscle fatigue results. Another limitation of the lactic acid system that relates to its anaerobic quality is that only a few moles of ATP can be resynthesized from the breakdown of sugar. This system cannot be relied on for extended periods of time.

The lactic acid system, like the ATP-CP system, is important primarily because it provides a rapid supply of ATP energy. For example, exercises that are performed at maximum rates for between 1 and 3 minutes depend heavily upon the lactic acid system. In activities such as running 1500 meters or a mile, the lactic acid system is used predominantly for the "kick" at the end of the race.

== Aerobic metabolism ==
=== Aerobic glycolysis ===
- Aerobic glycolysis
  Glycolysis – The first stage is known as glycolysis, which produces 2 ATP molecules, 2 reduced molecules of nicotinamide adenine dinucleotide (NADH) and 2 pyruvate molecules that move on to the next stage – the Krebs cycle. Glycolysis takes place in the cytoplasm of normal body cells, or the sarcoplasm of muscle cells.
- The Krebs cycle – This is the second stage, and the products of this stage of the aerobic system are a net production of one ATP, one carbon dioxide molecule, three reduced NAD^{+} molecules, and one reduced flavin adenine dinucleotide (FAD) molecule. (The molecules of NAD^{+} and FAD mentioned here are electron carriers, and if they are reduced, they have had one or two H^{+} ions and two electrons added to them.) The metabolites are for each turn of the Krebs cycle. The Krebs cycle turns twice for each six-carbon molecule of glucose that passes through the aerobic system – as two three-carbon pyruvate molecules enter the Krebs cycle. Before pyruvate enters the Krebs cycle it must be converted to acetyl coenzyme A. During this link reaction, for each molecule of pyruvate converted to acetyl coenzyme A, a NAD^{+} is also reduced. This stage of the aerobic system takes place in the matrix of the cells' mitochondria.
- Oxidative phosphorylation – The last stage of the aerobic system produces the largest yield of ATP – a total of 34 ATP molecules. It is called oxidative phosphorylation because oxygen is the final acceptor of electrons and hydrogen ions (hence oxidative) and an extra phosphate is added to ADP to form ATP (hence phosphorylation).

This stage of the aerobic system occurs on the cristae (infoldings of the membrane of the mitochondria). The reaction of each NADH in this electron transport chain provides enough energy for 3 molecules of ATP, while reaction of FADH_{2} yields 2 molecules of ATP. This means that 10 total NADH molecules allow the regeneration of 30 ATP, and 2 FADH_{2} molecules allow for 4 ATP molecules to be regenerated (in total 34 ATP from oxidative phosphorylation, plus 4 from the previous two stages, producing a total of 38 ATP in the aerobic system). NADH and FADH_{2} are oxidized to allow the NAD^{+} and FAD to be reused in the aerobic system, while electrons and hydrogen ions are accepted by oxygen to produce water, a harmless byproduct.

=== Fatty acid oxidation ===
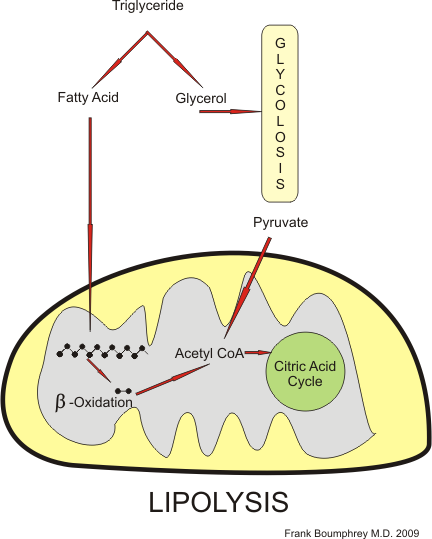

Triglycerides stored in adipose tissue and in other tissues, such as muscle and liver, release fatty acids and glycerol in a process known as lipolysis. Fatty acids are slower than glucose to convert into acetyl-CoA, as first it has to go through beta oxidation. It takes about 10 minutes for fatty acids to sufficiently produce ATP. Fatty acids are the primary fuel source at rest and in low to moderate intensity exercise. Though slower than glucose, its yield is much higher. One molecule of glucose produces through aerobic glycolysis a net of 30-32 ATP; whereas a fatty acid can produce through beta oxidation a net of approximately 100 ATP depending on the type of fatty acid. For example, palmitic acid can produce a net of 106 ATP.

=== Amino acid degradation ===
Amino acid degradation

Normally, amino acids do not provide the bulk of fuel substrates. However, in times of glycolytic or ATP crisis, amino acids can convert into pyruvate, acetyl-CoA, and citric acid cycle intermediates. This is useful during strenuous exercise or starvation as it provides faster ATP than fatty acids; however, it comes at the expense of risking protein catabolism (such as the breakdown of muscle tissue) to maintain the free amino acid pool.

=== Purine nucleotide cycle ===
The purine nucleotide cycle is used in times of glycolytic or ATP crisis, such as strenuous exercise or starvation. It produces fumarate, a citric acid cycle intermediate, which enters the mitochondrion through the malate-aspartate shuttle, and from there produces ATP by oxidative phosphorylation.

=== Ketolysis ===
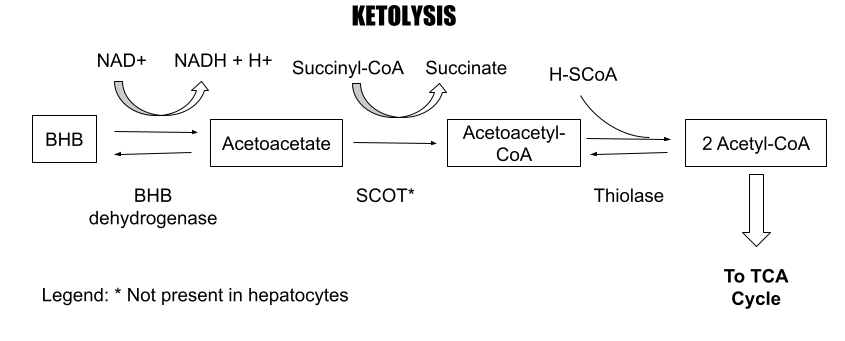

During starvation or while consuming a low-carb/ketogenic diet, the liver produces ketones. Ketones are needed as fatty acids cannot pass the blood-brain barrier, blood glucose levels are low and glycogen reserves depleted. Ketones also convert to acetyl-CoA faster than fatty acids. After the ketones convert to acetyl-CoA in a process known as ketolysis, it enters the citric acid cycle to produce ATP by oxidative phosphorylation.

The longer that the person's glycogen reserves have been depleted, the higher the blood concentration of ketones, typically due to starvation or a low carb diet (βHB 3 - 5 mM). Prolonged high-intensity aerobic exercise, such as running 20 miles, where individuals "hit the wall" can create post-exercise ketosis; however, the level of ketones produced are smaller (βHB 0.3 - 2 mM).

=== Ethanol metabolism ===
Ethanol (alcohol) is first converted into acetaldehyde, consuming NAD^{+} twice, before being converted into acetate. The acetate is then converted into acetyl-CoA. When alcohol is consumed in small quantities, the NADH/NAD^{+} ratio remains in balance enough for the acetyl-CoA to be used by the Krebs cycle for oxidative phosphorylation. However, even moderate amounts of alcohol (1-2 drinks) results in more NADH than NAD^{+}, which inhibits oxidative phosphorylation.

When the NADH/NAD^{+} ratio is disrupted (far more NADH than NAD^{+}), this is called pseudohypoxia. The Krebs cycle needs NAD^{+} as well as oxygen, for oxidative phosphorylation. Without sufficient NAD^{+}, the impaired aerobic metabolism mimics hypoxia (insufficient oxygen), resulting in excessive use of anaerobic glycolysis and a disrupted pyruvate/lactate ratio (low pyruvate, high lactate). The conversion of pyruvate into lactate produces NAD^{+}, but only enough to maintain anaerobic glycolysis. In chronic excessive alcohol consumption (alcoholism), the microsomal ethanol oxidizing system (MEOS) is used in addition to alcohol dehydrogenase.

== See also ==
- Hitting the wall (muscle fatigue due to glycogen depletion)
- Second wind (increased ATP synthesis primarily from free fatty acids)
