= Adenylosuccinate lyase deficiency =

- Other names: Adenylosuccinase deficiency,
- Adenylosuccinate lyase deficiency has an autosomal recessive pattern of inheritance.
- Symptoms: Aggressive behavior, Microcephaly
- Causes: Lack of the enzyme adenylosuccinate lyase
- Diagnostic method: MRI, Genetic testing
- Treatment: D-ribose and uridine administration

Adenylosuccinate lyase deficiency is a rare autosomal recessive metabolic disorder characterized by the appearance of succinylaminoimidazolecarboxamide riboside (SAICA riboside) and succinyladenosine (S-Ado) in cerebrospinal fluid, urine. These two succinylpurines are the dephosphorylated derivatives of SAICA ribotide (SAICAR) and adenylosuccinate (S-AMP), the two substrates of adenylosuccinate lyase (ADSL), which catalyzes an important reaction in the de novo pathway of purine biosynthesis. ADSL catalyzes two distinct reactions in the synthesis of purine nucleotides, both of which involve the β-elimination of fumarate to produce aminoimidazole carboxamide ribotide (AICAR) from SAICAR or adenosine monophosphate (AMP) from S-AMP.

== Types ==
ADSLD is divided into three categories based on the severity of symptoms: the fatal neonatal form, type I and type II. However, as symptoms occur along a spectrum there are no set criteria to determine which category a patient should be ascribed to.

=== Fatal neonatal form ===
Patients with this form of ADSLD present with fatal neonatal encephalopathy, respiratory failure, a lack of spontaneous movement and intractable seizures. Possible prenatal symptoms such as microcephaly, intrauterine growth restriction, loss of fetal heart rate variability and hypokinesia have been reported. Death occurs within the first few weeks of life.

=== Type I ===
This is the most common form of ADSLD. Symptoms that become apparent in the first months of life include seizures, microcephaly and severe psychomotor retardation and are purely neurological. Some patients display axial hypotonia, peripheral hypertonia and normal tendon reflexes. Autistic-like behavior including poor eye contact, stereotypies, agitation, tantrums, and self injurious behavior may occur.

=== Type II ===
This is considered to be a mild to moderate form of ADSLD. They may demonstrate a milder degree of psychomotor retardation and transient visual and auditory contact disturbances Seizures, if they occur, begin later than in Type I, typically between 2 and 4 years old but sometimes as late as 9 years old. Speech is impaired with receptive language skills and nonverbal communication skills being better than expressive language skills. Ataxia may occur and cause increasingly severe gait disturbances.

== Signs and symptoms ==
Among the signs and symptoms of adenylosuccinate lyase deficiency are the following:

- Aggressive behavior
- Microcephaly
- Autism
- Brachycephaly
- Mild cerebellar hypoplasia
- Seizures

== Pathophysiology ==
Adenylosuccinate lyase deficiency is responsible for a range of symptoms that involve psychomotor retardation, often accompanied by epileptic seizures, and autistic features. Two common theories were proposed to account for these effects, the first is that they result from decreased concentrations of purine nucleotides needed for purine biosynthesis. Decreased concentrations, however, could not be found in various tissues taken from ADSL-deficient people, probably because purines are furnished via the purine salvage pathway. The second is the buildup of accumulating succinylpurines causes neurotoxic effects. In the severely affected individuals, the concentration levels of SAICA riboside and S-Ado are comparable, whereas in people with milder forms of the disease, the ratio of S-Ado is more than double that of those more severely affected, while SAICA riboside concentration levels remain comparable.

Biochemical studies of the enzyme have focused on proteins of ADSL from nonhuman species, the ADSL structure from the crystallized protein of Thermotoga maritime has been used, along with DNA sequencing data, to construct homology models for a variety of other organisms, including human ADSL. A variety of studies have been done using the equivalent enzyme from Bacillus subtilis, which shares a significant percentage of identity along with about some percentage of similarity in amino acid sequence with the human enzyme. Homology models overlaid on each other show a high degree of overlap between the enzymes.

The family of enzymes to which ADSL belongs and that catalyze β-eliminations in which fumarate is one of the products are homotetramers with four active sites composed of amino acid residues from three distinct subunits. Much is known about the active site of human ADSL due to studies of the active site in the B. subtilis ADSL through affinity labeling and site-directed mutagenesis. While there is some variability among species in the sequencing of ADSL, the active site of the enzyme contains many residues that are conserved across species and have been shown to be critical to the enzyme's function. His^{68} and His^{141} seem to serve as the general acid and base catalysts, and are critical to the catalyzing reaction of the substrate. His^{89} seems to enhance the binding of the substrate's phosphoryl group and orient adenylosuccinate for catalysis. All three histidines are conserved throughout the 28 species for which the structure of ADSL is known. Glu^{275} and Lys^{268} have also been shown to contribute to the active site, indicating there are four active sites, each of which is formed from regions of three subunits. ADSL deficiency in different people is often caused by different mutations to the enzyme, more than 50 different mutations in the ADSL gene have been discovered.

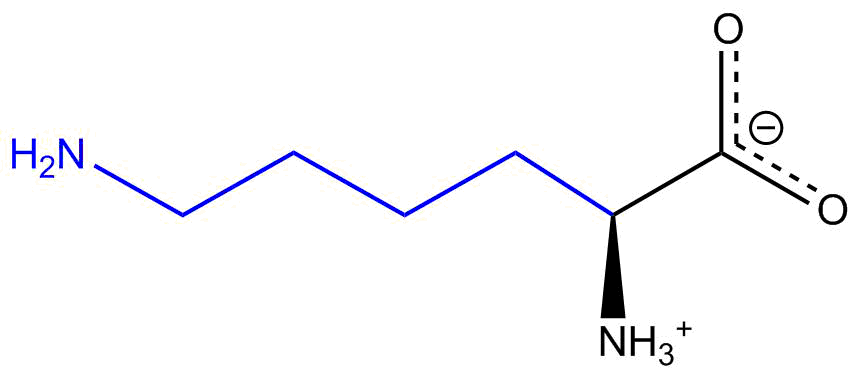
Lysine

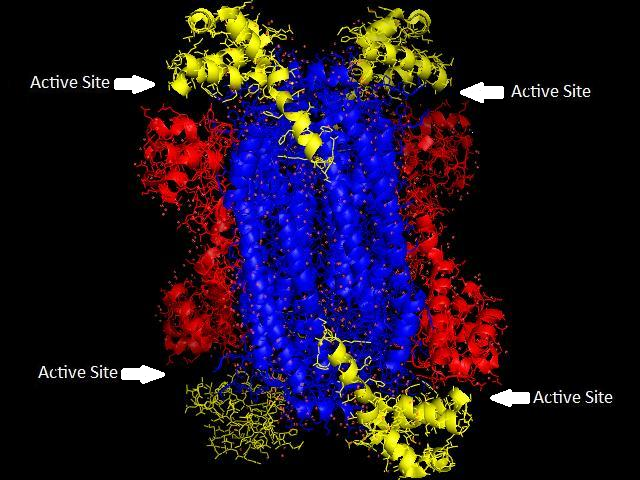
Adenylosuccinate lyase

== Diagnosis ==
In terms of the diagnosis of adenylosuccinate lyase deficiency one should look for (or exam/method):

- Demonstration of succinylpurines in extracellular fluids like plasma, cerebrospinal fluid and/or urine using high-pressure liquid chromatography, with or without mass spectroscopy
- Genetic testing - genomic cDNA sequencing of the ADSL gene and characterization of mutant proteins.

== Treatment ==
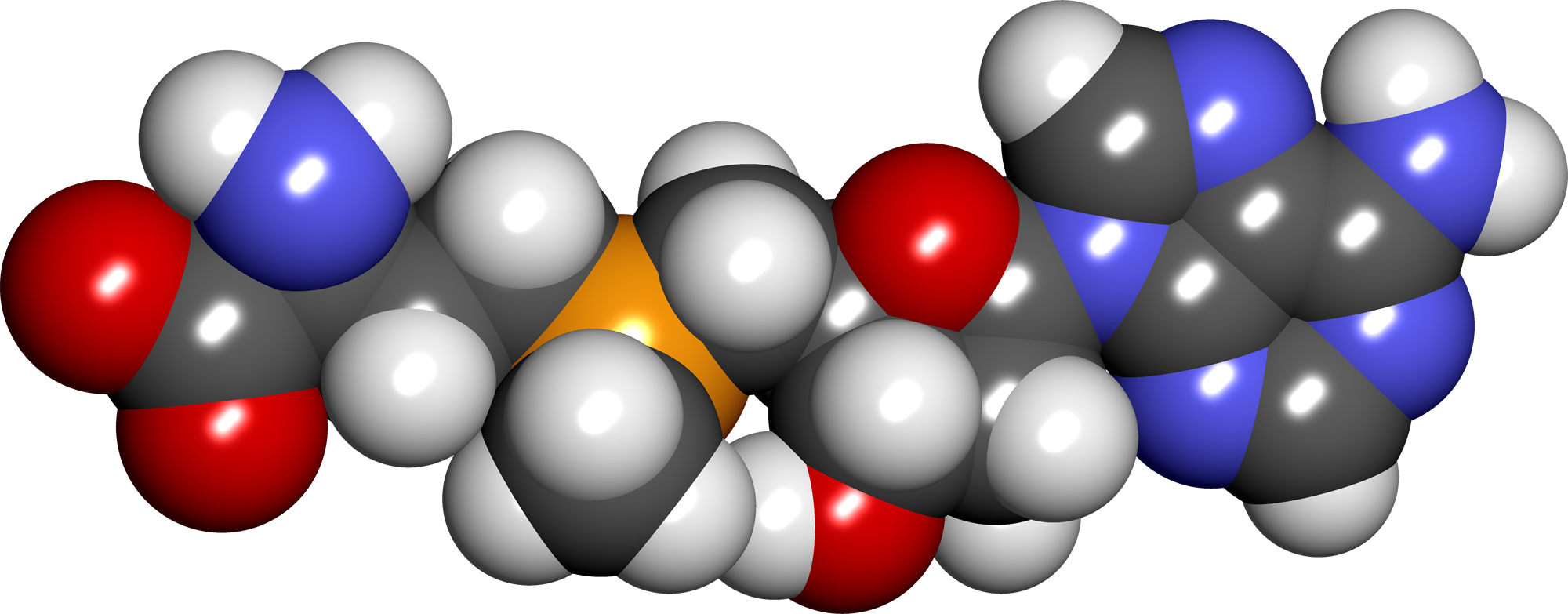
S-adenosylmethionine

In milder forms, epileptic seizures can be treated with anti-convulsants however, many patients with moderate to severe forms experience refractory epilepsy, which is not well controlled with medications.Child with adenylosuccinate lyase deficiency caused by a novel complex heterozygous mutation in the ADSL gene: A case report Although none has been proven effective, treatment options include:

- D-ribose and uridine administration
- Ketogenic diet
- S-adenosyl-l-methionine

== Prognosis ==
The prognosis of this condition in childhood often has a stable outcome, although some experience a shortened lifespan. The neonatal form is almost always fatal, according to Jurecka, et al.

== See also ==
- Adenylosuccinate
- Adenylosuccinate lyase
- List of genetic disorders
