= Riboflavin-responsive exercise intolerance =

Riboflavin-responsive exercise intolerance (SLC25A32 deficiency) is a rare disorder caused by mutations of the SLC25A32 gene that encodes the mitochondrial folate transporter. Patients suffer from exercise intolerance and may have disrupted motor function.

A positive correlation between SLC25A32 dysfunction and flavoenzyme deficiency has been observed suggesting that SLC25A32 is in fact a mitochondrial FAD transporter. In mice studies, besides β-oxidation and amino acid metabolism being impaired by mitochondrial FAD deficiency, Slc25a32 wipeout embryos experienced dysfunction of the glycine cleavage system– dihydrolipoamide dehydrogenase. This dihydrolipoamide dehydrogenase dysfunction disrupted folate-mediated one-carbon metabolism, leading a deficiency of 5-methyltetrahydrofolate.

== Symptoms and signs ==
Patients suffer from exercise intolerance and may also have neuromuscular symptoms such as ataxia, dysarthia and muscle weakness. Staining of skeletal muscle samples with hematoxylin and eosin may reveal the ragged red fibers sign indicating disrupted mitochondrial function. In some patients, hypoketotic hypoglycemia was described.

== Treatment ==
Treatment with riboflavin, 5-formyltetrahydrofolate (Folinic acid) and/or L-5-methyltetrahydrofolate (5-MTHF) may lead to a drastic improvement of symptoms. Pyridoxal - 5 - Phosphate (P5P), a cofactor for the enzyme Serine hydroxymethyltransferase, may also assist with the conversion of tetrahydrofolate (THF) to 5,10-Methylenetetrahydrofolate (5,10-CH_{2}-THF) a direct precursor to L-5-methyltetrahydrofolate (5-MTHF).

== History ==
Riboflavin - responsive exercise intolerance was first described in 2016 by Schiff et al.

== See also ==
- Multiple acyl-CoA dehydrogenase deficiency - similar in biochemical features; responsive to riboflavin in the majority of late-onset cases.
