= Mitochondrial folate transporter =

Transport protein

SLC25A32

Identifiers
- Aliases: SLC25A32, MFT, MFTC, RREI, solute carrier family 25 member 32, GLYB, Mitochondrial folate transporter
- External IDs: OMIM: 610815; MGI: 1917156; GeneCards: SLC25A32
RNA expression pattern
Bgee	Human / Mouse (ortholog); Top expressed in: Achilles tendon; lymph node; stromal cell of endometrium; islet of Langerhans; smooth muscle tissue; subcutaneous adipose tissue; popliteal artery; appendix; left uterine tube; thoracic aorta / n/a; More reference expression data
BioGPS	n/a
Gene ontology
Molecular function	folic acid transmembrane transporter activity; FAD transmembrane transporter activity; transmembrane transporter activity
Cellular component	membrane; mitochondrion; mitochondrial membranes; mitochondrial inner membrane; integral component of membrane
Biological process	glycine metabolic process; folic acid metabolic process; folic acid transport; folate import into mitochondrion; mitochondrial transport; FAD transmembrane transport; transmembrane transport
Sources:Amigo / QuickGO
Orthologs
Databases	NCBI: entry
Species	Human	Mouse
Entrez	81034	69906
Ensembl	n/a	ENSMUSG00000022299
UniProt	Q9H2D1	Q8BMG8
RefSeq (mRNA)	NM_030780	NM_172402
RefSeq (protein)	NP_110407	NP_765990
Location (UCSC)	n/a	n/a
PubMed search
- Wikidata
View/Edit Human	View/Edit Mouse

Mitochondrial folate transporter

Identifiers
- Symbol: MFT
- Alt. symbols: SLC25A32
- Alt. names: Solute carrier family 25, member 32
- OMIM: 138480

Other data
- Locus: Chr. 8 q22.3

The mitochondrial folate transporter (MTF) is a transport protein that facilitates the transfer of tetrahydrofolate across the inner mitochondrial membrane. It is encoded by the SLC25A32 gene and belongs to the mitochondrial carrier superfamily.

== History ==
The mitochondrial folate transporter was first described in 2000.

== Role in pathology ==
Mutations of the SLC25A32 gene cause the condition putatively called "riboflavin-responsive exercise intolerance" (RREI), also known as SLC25A32 deficiency. The first case report linking this condition to SLC25A32 was published in 2016. Several additional cases of SLC25A32 deficiency have been described since. The phenotype of the patients is reminiscent of multiple acyl-CoA dehydrogenase deficiency (MADD).

According to a review published in 2020, mutations of the SLC25A32 gene have been shown to cause neural tube defects in mice, and they have been associated with several human cases, based on a re-sequencing of DNA of patients with neural tube defects.
