= Riboside =

A riboside is any glycoside of ribose. Ribosides in the form of ribonucleosides and ribonucleotides play an important role in biochemistry.
