= Oxygen cascade =

Flow of oxygen from air to mitochondria

In respiratory physiology, the oxygen cascade describes the flow of oxygen from air to mitochondria, where it is consumed in aerobic respiration to release energy. Oxygen flows from areas with high partial pressure of oxygen (PO_{2}, also known as oxygen tension) to areas of lower PO_{2}.

Air is typically around 21% oxygen, and at sea level, the PO_{2} of air is typically around 159 mmHg. Humidity dilutes the concentration of oxygen in air. As air is inhaled into the lungs, it mixes with water and exhaust gasses including CO_{2}, further diluting the oxygen concentration and lowering the PO_{2}. As oxygen continues to flow down the concentration gradient from areas of higher concentration to areas of lower concentration, it must pass through barriers such as the alveoli walls, capillary walls, capillary blood plasma, red blood cell membrane, interstitial space, other cell membranes, and cell cytoplasm. The partial pressure of oxygen drops across each barrier.

== Table ==
Table 1 gives the example of a typical oxygen cascade for skeletal muscle of a healthy, adult male at rest who is breathing air at atmospheric pressure at sea level. Actual values in a person may vary widely due to ambient conditions, health status, tissue type, and metabolic demands.

Table 1: An Example Oxygen Cascade
Location	Partial pressure of oxygen (mmHg)	Notes
Dry air	159	Air is ~21% oxygen
Moist air	150	Air is humidified in the respiratory tract
Alveolar air	110-100	Alveolar air includes exhaust gases such as CO_{2}
Arterial blood (PaO_{2})	98-95	Oxygen must cross the alveoli, leading to a drop in PO_{2} called the alveolar-to-arterial gradient (typically a drop of 1-5 mmHg, but sometimes larger).
Venous blood (PvO_{2})	40-35	Arterial blood offloads oxygen in the capillaries before flowing into the venous system. The partial pressure of oxygen in venous blood (PvO_{2}) can range widely in different veins that drain different tissues because of differences in oxygen demand of the tissues.
Interstitial space in a resting skeletal muscle	18-13	The capillary walls provide physical barriers that partially resist oxygen transfer from the blood to the interstitial space.
Intracellular space in skeletal muscle cells (PO_{2is})	14-10	The cell membranes provide physical barriers that partially resist oxygen transfer from the interstitial space to the intracellular space.
Mitochondria	10-0	The partial pressure of oxygen in mitochondria is generally assumed to be lower than the surroundings because the mitochondria consume oxygen. If the oxygen level is too low, mitochondria cannot metabolize nutrients for energy via aerobic metabolism. The shift between aerobic and anaerobic metabolism has profound physiological consequences.

== See also ==
- Alveolar–arterial gradient
- Alveolar gas equation
- Blood gas tension
