= Adenylosuccinate =

Names
- IUPAC name (2S)-2-[[9-[(2R,3R,4S,5R)-3,4-Dihydroxy-5-(phosphonooxymethyl)oxolan-2-yl]purin-6-yl]amino]butanedioic acid

Identifiers
CAS Number	19046-78-7
3D model (JSmol)	Interactive image
ChEBI	CHEBI:15919
ChemSpider	389122
MeSH	Adenylosuccinate
PubChem CID	447145
UNII	X1B4ZJ0IIV
- InChI: InChI=1S/C14H18N5O11P/c20-7(21)1-5(14(24)25)18-11-8-12(16-3-15-11)19(4-17-8)13-10(23)9(22)6(30-13)2-29-31(26,27)28/h3-6,9-10,13,22-23H,1-2H2,(H,20,21)(H,24,25)(H,15,16,18)(H2,26,27,28)/t5?,6-,9-,10-,13-/m1/s1 Key: OFBHPPMPBOJXRT-DPXQIYNJSA-N; InChI=1/C14H18N5O11P/c20-7(21)1-5(14(24)25)18-11-8-12(16-3-15-11)19(4-17-8)13-10(23)9(22)6(30-13)2-29-31(26,27)28/h3-6,9-10,13,22-23H,1-2H2,(H,20,21)(H,24,25)(H,15,16,18)(H2,26,27,28)/t5?,6-,9-,10-,13-/m1/s1 Key: OFBHPPMPBOJXRT-DPXQIYNJBG
- SMILES: C1=NC2=C(C(=N1)N[C@@H](CC(=O)O)C(=O)O)N=CN2[C@H]3[C@@H]([C@@H]([C@H](O3)COP(=O)(O)O)O)O

Properties
Chemical formula	C_{14}H_{18}N_{5}O_{11}P
Molar mass	463.296 g·mol^{−1}
- Except where otherwise noted, data are given for materials in their standard state (at 25 °C [77 °F], 100 kPa). verify (what is ?) Infobox references

Adenylosuccinate, also known as succinyl-adenosine monophosphate (S-AMP), is an intermediate in the interconversion of purine nucleotides inosine monophosphate (IMP) and adenosine monophosphate (AMP). The enzyme adenylosuccinate synthase carries out the reaction of IMP to S-AMP in a 2 step mechanism, requiring the input of energy from a phosphoanhydride bond from the hydrolysis of guanosine triphosphate (GTP) first, followed by the addition of aspartate. This reaction needs Mg^{2+}, and is competitively inhibited by the subsequent product AMP in a negative feedback mechanism. GTP, the product of another pathway from IMP, is used instead of adenosine triphosphate (ATP) as the phosphate source. The enzyme adenylosuccinate lyase carries out the reaction removing the carbon skeleton from S-AMP attached from aspartate, forming AMP and fumarate. The pathway from IMP to AMP is present across various prokaryotes and eukaryotes, and is linked to various diseases. S-AMP has been observed to stimulate insulin production.

== See also ==
- Adenylosuccinate lyase deficiency
- Purine nucleotide cycle
