= Sarcoplasm =

Cytoplasm of a muscle cell, including the sarcoplasmic reticulum

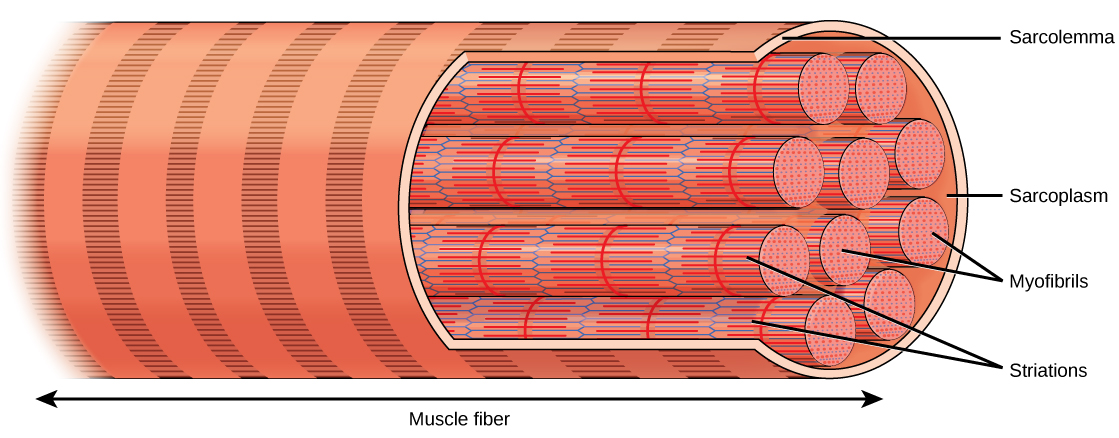
- Sarcoplasm shown with a muscle fiber

Details
- Location: Cytoplasm of muscle cell

Identifiers
- Latin: sarcoplasma
- TH: H2.00.05.0.00004

Sarcoplasm is the cytoplasm of a muscle cell. It is comparable to the cytoplasm of other cells, but it contains unusually large amounts of glycogen (a polymer of glucose), myoglobin (a red-colored protein necessary for binding oxygen molecules that diffuse into muscle fibers), and mitochondria. The calcium ion concentration in sarcoplasm is also a special element of the muscle fiber; it is the means by which muscle contractions take place and are regulated. The sarcoplasm plays a critical role in muscle contraction as an increase in Ca^{2+} concentration in the sarcoplasm begins the process of filament sliding. The decrease in Ca^{2+} in the sarcoplasm subsequently ceases filament sliding. The sarcoplasm also aids in pH and ion balance within muscle cells.

It contains mostly myofibrils (which are composed of sarcomeres), but its contents are otherwise comparable to those of the cytoplasm of other cells. It has a Golgi apparatus near the nucleus, mitochondria just inside the cell membrane (sarcolemma), and a smooth endoplasmic reticulum (specialized for muscle function and called the sarcoplasmic reticulum).

While sarcoplasm and myoplasm, viewed etymologically, might seem to be synonyms, they are not. Whereas sarcoplasm is a type of cytoplasm, myoplasm is the entire contractile portion of muscle tissue.

While some authors argue that the proteins and other molecules within the sarcoplasmic reticulum lumen technically belong to the sarcoplasm. These molecules are not part of the sarcoplasmic reticulum membrane itself but reside within the enclosed sarcoplasmic reticulum space. In that sense, one could say the sarcoplasmic reticulum has a type of specialized sarcoplasm.
