= List of diseases (G) =

This is a list of diseases starting with the letter "G".

== Ga ==
=== Gal–Gap ===
- Galactorrhea
- Galactocoele
- Galactokinase deficiency
- Galactorrhea hyperprolactinemia
- Galactosamine-6-sulfatase deficiency
- Galactose-1-phosphate uridylyltransferase deficiency
- Galactosemia
- Galloway Mowat syndrome
- Gamborg–Nielsen syndrome
- Game–Friedman–Paradice syndrome
- Gamma aminobutyric acid transaminase deficiency
- Gamma-cystathionase deficiency
- Gamma-sarcoglycanopathy
- Gamstorp episodic adynamy
- Ganglioglioma
- Gangliosidosis
  - Gangliosidosis (Type2)(GM2)
  - Gangliosidosis GM1 type 3
  - Gangliosidosis type1
- Ganser syndrome
- GAPO syndrome
- Garchichiliosis

=== Gar–Gau ===
- Garcia–Torres–Guarner syndrome
- Gardner–Morrisson–Abbot syndrome
- Gardner–Silengo–Wachtel syndrome
- Gardner–Diamond syndrome
- Gardner's syndrome
- Garret–Tripp syndrome
- Gas/bloat syndrome
- Gastric dumping syndrome
- Gastric lymphoma
- Gastritis, familial giant hypertrophic
- Gastrocutaneous syndrome
- Gastroenteritis, eosinophilic
- Gastro-enteropancreatic neuroendocrine tumor
- Gastroenteritis
- Gastroesophageal reflux
- Gastrointestinal autonomic nerve tumor
- Gastrointestinal neoplasm
- Gaucher disease

- Gaucher disease type 1
- Gaucher disease type 2
- Gaucher disease type 3
- Gaucher ichthyosis restrictive dermopathy
- Gaucher-like disease

=== Gay ===
- Gay–Feinmesser–Cohen syndrome

== Ge ==
=== Gee–Gem ===
- Geen Sandford Davison syndrome
- Gelatinous ascites
- Geleophysic dwarfism
- Gelineau disease
- Geliphobia
- Gemignani syndrome
- Gemss syndrome

=== Gen–Ger ===
- Gender dysphoria
- Genée-Wiedemann syndrome
- Generalized anxiety disorder (GAD)
- Generalized malformations in neuronal migration
- Generalized resistance to thyroid hormone
- Generalized seizure
- Generalized torsion dystonia
- Genes syndrome
- Genetic diseases, inborn
- Genetic reflex epilepsy
- Genetic susceptibility to infections caused by BCG
- Genital anomaly cardiomyopathy
- Genital dwarfism, Turner type
- Genital dwarfism
- Genital retraction syndrome (also known as koro)
- Genito palatocardiac syndrome
- Genu valgum, st. Helena familial
- Genu varum
- Genuphobia
- Geographic tongue
- German syndrome
- Germinal cell aplasia
- Gerodermia osteodysplastica
- Gershinibaruch–Leibo syndrome
- Gerstmann syndrome

=== Ges ===
- Gestational diabetes mellitus
- Gestational pemphigoid
- Gestational trophoblastic disease

== Gh ==
- Ghosal syndrome
- Ghose–Sachdev–Kumar syndrome

== Gi ==
- Gianotti-Crosti syndrome
- Giant axonal neuropathy
- Giant cell arteritis
- Giant cell myocarditis
- Giant congenital nevi
- Giant ganglionic hyperplasia
- Giant hypertrophic gastritis
- Giant mammary hamartoma
- Giant papillary conjunctivitis
- Giant pigmented hairy nevus
- Giant platelet syndrome
- Giardiasis
- Gibson's Syndrome
- Giedion syndrome
- Gigantism advanced bone age hoarse cry
- Gigantism partial, nevi, hemihypertrophy, macrocephaly
- Gigantism
- Gilbert's syndrome
- Gilles de la Tourette's syndrome
- Gingival fibromatosis dominant
- Gingival fibromatosis facial dysmorphism
- Gingival fibrosis
- Gingivitis
- Gyrate atrophy of the choroid and retina
- Gitelman syndrome
- Gittings syndrome

== Gl ==
=== Gla–Gli ===
- Glanzmann thrombasthenia
- Glass–Chapman–Hockley syndrome
- Glaucoma
  - Glaucoma ecopia microspherophakia stiff joints short stature
  - Glaucoma iridogoniodysgenesia
  - Glaucoma sleep apnea
  - Glaucoma type 1C
  - Glaucoma, congenital
  - Glaucoma, hereditary adult type 1A
  - Glaucoma, hereditary juvenile type 1B
  - Glaucoma, hereditary
  - Glaucoma, primary infantile type 3A
  - Glaucoma, primary infantile type 3B
- Glioblastoma
- Glioma
- Gliosarcoma

=== Glo ===
- Globel disaccharide intolerance
- Glomerulonephritis sparse hair telangiectases
- Glomerulonephritis
- Glomerulosclerosis
- Gloomy face syndrome
- Glossodynia
- Glossopalatine ankylosis micrognathia ear anomalies
- Glossopharyngeal neuralgia
- Glossophobia

=== Glu ===
- Glucagonoma
- Glucocorticoid deficiency, familial
- Glucocorticoid resistance
- Glucocorticoid sensitive hypertension
- Glucose 6 phosphate dehydrogenase deficiency
- Glucose-6-phosphate translocase deficiency
- Glucose-galactose malabsorption
- Glucosephosphate isomerase deficiency
- Glucosidase acid-1,4-alpha deficiency
- Glut2 deficiency
- Glutamate decarboxylase deficiency
- Glutamate-aspartate transport defect
- Glutaricaciduria I
- Glutaricaciduria II
- Glutaryl-CoA dehydrogenase deficiency
- Glutathione synthetase deficiency

=== Gly ===
- Glyceraldehyde-3-phosphate dehydrogenase deficiency
- Glycine synthase deficiency
- Glycogen storage disease

- Glycogen storage disease type 1B
- Glycogen storage disease type 1C
- Glycogen storage disease type 1D
- Glycogen storage disease type 6, due to phosphorylation
- Glycogen storage disease type 7
- Glycogen storage disease type 9
- Glycogen storage disease type II
- Glycogen storage disease type V
- Glycogen storage disease type VI
- Glycogen storage disease type VII
- Glycogen storage disease type VIII

- Glycogenosis

- Glycogenosis type II
- Glycogenosis type III
- Glycogenosis type IV
- Glycogenosis type V
- Glycogenosis type VI
- Glycogenosis type VII
- Glycogenosis type VIII
- Glycogenosis, type 0

- Glycosuria

== Gm ==
- GM2 gangliosidosis, 0 variant
- GM2-gangliosidosis, B, B1, AB variant
- GMS syndrome

== Go ==
=== Goi–Gon ===
- Goitre
- Goldberg–Bull syndrome
- Goldberg syndrome
- Goldblatt–Wallis syndrome
- Goldblatt–Wallis–Zieff syndrome
- Goldblatt–Viljoen syndrome
- Goldenhar syndrome
- Goldskag–Cooks–Hertz syndrome
- Goldstein–Hutt syndrome
- Gollop–Coates syndrome
- Gollop syndrome
- Goltz syndrome
- Gombo syndrome
- Gomez and López-Hernández syndrome
- Gonadal dysgenesis

- Gonadal dysgenesis mixed
- Gonadal dysgenesis Turner type
- Gonadal dysgenesis XY type associated anomalies
- Gonadal dysgenesis, XX type
- Gonadal dysgenesis, XY female type
- Goniodysgenesis mental retardation short stature

- Gonococcal conjunctivitis
- Gonzales Del Angel syndrome

=== Goo–Gou ===
- Goodman camptodactyly
- Goodpasture pneumorenal syndrome
- Goodpasture's syndrome
- Gordon hyperkaliemia-hypertension syndrome
- Gordon syndrome
- Gorham syndrome
- Gorham's disease
- Gorham–Stout disease
- Gorlin–Bushkell–Jensen syndrome
- Gorlin–Chaudhry–Moss syndrome
- Gottron's syndrome
- Gougerot–Blum syndrome
- Gougerot–Sjogren syndrome
- Gout
- Gouty nephropathy, familial

== Gr ==
=== Gra–Gri ===
- Graft versus host disease
- Graham–Boyle–Troxell syndrome
- Grand–Kaine–Fulling syndrome
- Grant syndrome
- Granulocytopenia
- Granuloma annulare
- Granulomas, congenital cerebral
- Granulomatosis, lymphomatoid
- Granulomatous allergic angiitis
- Granulomatous hypophysitis
- Granulomatous rosacea
- Graphite pneumoconiosis
- Graves' disease
- Gray platelet syndrome
- Great vessels transposition
- Greenberg dysplasia
- Greig cephalopolysyndactyly syndrome GCPS
- Griscelli disease
- Grix–Blankenship–Peterson syndrome

=== Gro–Gru ===
- Groll–Hirschowitz syndrome
- Grosse syndrome
- Grover's disease
- Growth deficiency brachydactyly unusual facies
- Growth delay, constitutional
- Growth hormone deficiency
- Growth mental deficiency syndrome of Myhre
- Growth retardation alopecia pseudoanodontia optic
- Growth retardation hydrocephaly lung hypoplasia
- Growth retardation mental retardation phalangeal hypoplasia
- Grubben–Decock–Borghgraef syndrome

== Gt–Gy ==
- GTP cyclohydrolase deficiency
- Guanidinoacetate methyltransferase deficiency
- Guérin–Stern syndrome
- Guibaud–Vainsel syndrome
- Guillain–Barré syndrome
- Guizar–Vasquez–Luengas syndrome
- Guizar–Vasquez–Sanchez–Manzano syndrome
- Gunal–Seber–Basaran syndrome
- Gupta–Patton syndrome
- Gurrieri–Sammito–Bellussi syndrome
- Gusher syndrome
- Gymnophobia
- Gynecomastia
- Gyrate atrophy of the retina
- Gyrate atrophy
