= Myophosphorylase =

Muscle enzyme involved in glycogen breakdown

PYGM

Identifiers
- Aliases: PYGM, glycogen phosphorylase, muscle associated, GSD5
- External IDs: OMIM: 608455; MGI: 97830; GeneCards: PYGM
Available structures
PDB	Ortholog search: PDBe RCSB
PDB	List of PDB id codes 1Z8D
Enzyme activity
EC #	BRENDA	ExPASy	KEGG	MetaCyc
2.4.1.1	↗	↗	↗	↗

Gene location (Mouse)
Chr.	Chromosome 19 (mouse)
Band	19 A|19 4.53 cM	Start	6,434,429 bp
Band	19 A|19 4.53 cM	End	6,448,489 bp
RNA expression pattern
Bgee	Human / Mouse (ortholog); Top expressed in: triceps brachii muscle; gastrocnemius muscle; vastus lateralis muscle; deltoid muscle; tibialis anterior muscle; thoracic diaphragm; body of tongue; left ventricle; right ventricle; popliteal artery / Top expressed in: muscle of thigh; quadriceps femoris muscle; skeletal muscle tissue; zone of skin; esophagus; muscle of trunk; lip; heart; tongue muscle; muscle of upper limb; More reference expression data
BioGPS	n/a
Gene ontology
Molecular function	transferase activity; nucleotide binding; glycosyltransferase activity; 1,4-alpha-oligoglucan phosphorylase activity; catalytic activity; protein binding; pyridoxal phosphate binding; glycogen phosphorylase activity; SHG alpha-glucan phosphorylase activity; linear malto-oligosaccharide phosphorylase activity
Cellular component	cytosol; extracellular exosome; cytoplasm
Biological process	glycogen metabolic process; metabolism; glycogen catabolic process; carbohydrate metabolic process
Sources:Amigo / QuickGO
Orthologs
Databases	NCBI: entry
Species	Human	Mouse
Entrez	5837	19309
Ensembl	n/a	ENSMUSG00000032648
UniProt	P11217	Q9WUB3
RefSeq (mRNA)	NM_005609; NM_001164716	NM_011224
RefSeq (protein)	NP_001158188; NP_005600	NP_035354
Location (UCSC)	n/a	Chr 19: 6.43 – 6.45 Mb
PubMed search
- Wikidata
View/Edit Human	View/Edit Mouse

phosphorylase, glycogen; muscle (McArdle disease, glycogen storage disease type V)
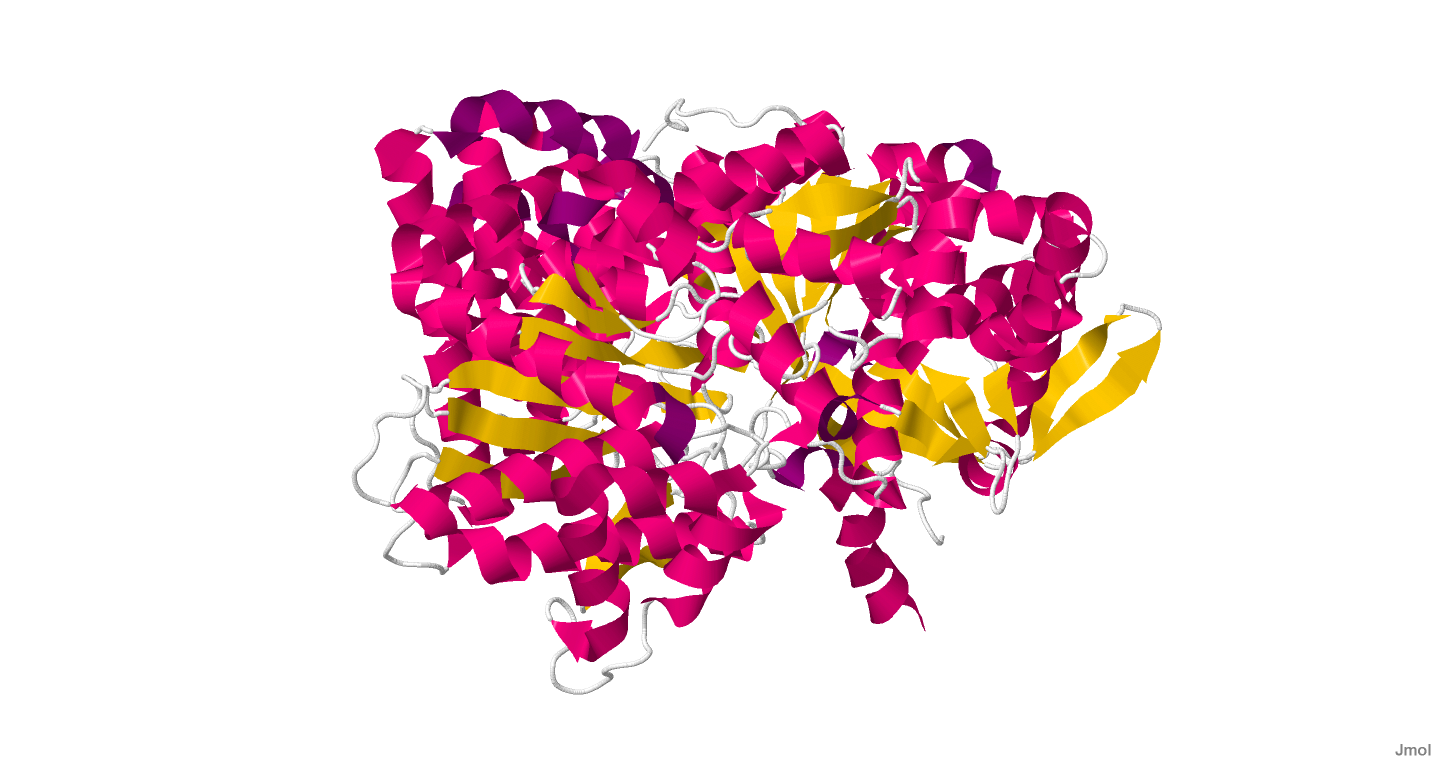
- Myophosphorylase

Identifiers
- Symbol: PYGM
- NCBI gene: 5837
- HGNC: 9726
- OMIM: 608455
- RefSeq: NM_005609
- UniProt: P11217

Other data
- EC number: 2.4.1.1
- Locus: Chr. 11 q12-q13.2
Search for
- Structures: Swiss-model
- Domains: InterPro

Myophosphorylase or glycogen phosphorylase, muscle form (PYGM) is an enzyme which in humans is encoded by the PYGM gene. It is the muscle isoform of the enzyme glycogen phosphorylase. This enzyme helps break down glycogen (a form of stored carbohydrate) into glucose-1-phosphate (not glucose), so it can be used within the muscle cell. Mutations in this gene are associated with McArdle disease (GSD-V, myophosphorylase deficiency), a glycogen storage disease of muscle.

Myophosphorylase comes in two forms: form 'a' is phosphorylated by phosphorylase kinase, form 'b' is not phosphorylated. Form 'a' is de-phosphorylated into form 'b' by the enzyme phosphoprotein phosphatase, which is activated by elevated insulin.

Both forms 'a' and 'b' of myophosphorylase have two conformational states: active (R or relaxed) and inactive (T or tense). When either form 'a' or 'b' are in the active state, then the enzyme converts glycogen into glucose-1-phosphate.

Myophosphorylase-b is allosterically activated by elevated AMP within the cell, and allosterically inactivated by elevated ATP and/or glucose-6-phosphate. Myophosphorylase-a is active, unless allosterically inactivated by elevated glucose within the cell. In this way, myophosphorylase-a is the more active of the two forms as it will continue to convert glycogen into glucose-1-phosphate even with high levels of glycogen-6-phosphate and ATP. (See Glycogen phosphorylase§Regulation).

== Structure ==
PYGM is located on the q arm of chromosome 11 in position 13.1 and has 20 exons. PYGM, the protein encoded by this gene, is a member of the glycogen phosphorylase family and is a homodimer that associates into a tetramer to form the enzymatically active phosphorylase A. It contains an AMP binding site at p. 76, two sites involved in association of subunits at p. 109 and p. 143, and a site believed to be involved in allosteric control at p. 156. Its structure consists of 24 beta strands, 43 alpha helixes, and 11 turns. PYGM also has the following modified residues: N-acetylserine at p. 2, phosphoserine at p. 15, 2014, 227, 430, 473, 514, 747, and 748, and N6-(pyridoxal phosphate)lysine at p. 681. There is a post-translational modification in which phosphorylation of Ser-15 converts phosphorylase B (unphosphorylated) to phosphorylase A. Alternative splicing results in multiple transcript variants.

== Function ==
Phosphorylase is an important allosteric enzyme in carbohydrate metabolism. This gene, PYGM, encodes a muscle enzyme involved in glycogenolysis. PYGM has a cofactor, pyridoxal 5'-phosphate, that aids this process. PYGM is located in the cytosol, extracellular exosome, and the cytoplasm. Highly similar enzymes encoded by different genes are found in liver and brain.

=== Catalytic activity ===
Glycogen phosphorylase catalyses the following reaction:

((1→4)-alpha-D-glucosyl) _{(n)} + phosphate = ((1→4)-alpha-D-glucosyl) _{(n-1)} + alpha-D-glucose 1-phosphate

== Clinical significance ==
A myophosphorylase deficiency is associated with Glycogen storage disease type V (GSD5), also known as "McArdle disease".

A case study suggested that a deficiency in myophosphorylase may be linked with cognitive impairment. Besides muscle, this isoform is present in astrocytes, where it plays a key role in neural energy metabolism. A 55-year-old woman with McArdle disease has expressed cognitive impairment with bilateral dysfunction of prefrontal and frontal cortex. Further studies are needed to assess the validity of this claim.

Additionally, mutations in the genes for myophosphorylase along with deoxyguanosine kinase have been associated with muscle glycogenosis and mitochondrial hepatopathy. The G456A PYGM mutation and duplication in exon 6 of dGK that results in a truncated protein have been associated with phosphorylase deficiency in muscle, cytochrome c oxidase deficiency in liver, severe congenital hypotonia, hepatomegaly, and liver failure. This expands on the current understanding of McArdle disease and suggests that this combination of mutations could result in a complex disease with severe phenotypes.

An autosomal dominant mutation on the PYGM gene impairs activity of myophosphorylase-a, but not myophosphorylase-b. Symptoms include adult-onset muscle weakness and muscle biopsy shows accumulation of the intermediate filament desmin in the myofibers. Unlike McArdle disease (GSD-V, myophosphorylase deficiency), this disease does not have exercise intolerance since glycogenolysis is still possible through allosteric AMP activation of myophosphorylase-b.

== Interactions ==
PYGM has been shown to have 64 binary protein-protein interactions including 21 co-complex interactions. PYGM appears to interact with PRKAB2, WDYHV1, PYGL, PYGB, 5-aminoisatin, 5-nh2_caproyl-isatin, PHKG1, PPP1CA, PPP1R3A, DEGS1, SET, MAP3K3, INPP5K, PACSIN3, CLASP2, NIPSNAP2, SRP72, LMNA, TRAPPC2, DNM2, IGBP1, SGCG, PDE4DIP, PPP1R3B, ARID1B, TTN, INTS4, FAM110A, TRIM54, TRIM55, WWP1, AGTPBP1, POMP, and CDC42BPB.

== See also ==
- McArdle disease (GSD-V, myophosphorylase deficiency)
- Glycogen Storage Disease
- Inborn Errors of Carbohydrate Metabolism
- Metabolic Myopathies
