= Maltodextrin phosphorylase =

Bacterial enzyme, type of phosphorylase

Maltodextrin phosphorylase is a phosphorylase enzyme (EC 2.4.1.1), more specifically one type of glycosyltransferase (EC 2.4). Maltodextrin phosphorylase plays a critical role in maltodextrin metabolism in E. coli. This bacterial enzyme, often referred to as MalP, catalyzes the phosphorolysis of an α-1,4-glycosidic bond in maltodextrins, removing the non-reducing glucosyl residues of linear oligosaccharides as glucose-1-phosphate (Glc1P). Phosphorylases are well-regarded for their allosteric effects on metabolism, however MalP exhibits no allosteric properties. It has a higher affinity for linear oligosaccharides than the related glycogen phosphorylase.

== Mechanism ==
Maltodextrin phosphorylase facilitates maltodextrin metabolism through phosphorolysis of nonreducing glucosyl residues in order to produce Glc1P. MalP has a higher affinity for short, linear α-1,4 linked glucose oligosaccharides, and consequently appears to act on maltodextrin degradation products. Without MalP, larger these products (typically composed of four or more glucosyl residues) are not degraded as easily for subsequent dextrin conversion into simple sugars

[(1→4)-α-D-glucosyl]_{(n)} + Pi ⇌ [(1→4)-α-D-glucosyl]_{(n-1)} + α-D-glucose-1-phosphate.

Previous study of the catalytic activity and kinetic properties of the MalP enzyme has revealed that it has different binding sites for the terminal glucose residue of the oligosaccharide and glucose-1-phosphate depending on whether its involvement is in the forward (phosphorylase) or reverse (synthesis) reaction. Though the maltodextrin phosphorylase enzyme is capable of catalysis in both directions in vitro, its physiologically favored direction is as a phosphorylase.

== Structure ==
The maltodextrin phosphorylase protomer is a large protein, composed of 796 amino acids with a mass of roughly 90 kDa in E. coli. While the enzyme can exist as an inactive monomer or tetramer, it is biologically active as a dimer of two identical subunits. Each MalP protomer contains one pyridoxal 5ʹ-phosphate cofactor in the active site, essential to catalytic activity.

== Application & Significance ==
No clinical significance of maltodextrin phosphorylase has been presently identified for use in humans; however, the enzyme may have biotechnological significance as it may allow for obtaining complex substrates for clinical research at less expense. Glc1P, a critical element to MalP's phosphorolytic bioconversion process and a rather expensive chemical, can be enzymatically derived from dextrins or other starchy materials.

== Regulation ==
Maltodextrin phosphorylase readily catalyzes the reverse reaction of Glc1P plus oligosaccharide to yield an oligosaccharide lengthened by one glucose residue and liberation of inorganic phosphate. The sequence of E. coli MalP is nearly 100% identical to the mammalian glycogen phosphorylase (GP) at the catalytic site. In comparison to the mammalian GP, MalP is a simpler enzyme. It is regulated neither by allosteric effectors nor phosphorylation and it is expressed in E. coli as a constitutively active enzyme.

Crystal structures of oligosaccharide bound across the catalytic site in both the binary and the ternary MalP enzyme/substrate complexes reveal the importance of the conformational change in the oligosaccharide substrate in the formation of ternary complexes and provides support for the role of the 50-phosphate group of pyridoxal phosphate (PLP) in catalysis.
