= Glycogen phosphorylase, liver form =

Protein-coding gene in the species Homo sapiens

PYGL

Identifiers
- Aliases: PYGL, GSD6, phosphorylase, glycogen, liver, glycogen phosphorylase L
- External IDs: OMIM: 613741; MGI: 97829; GeneCards: PYGL
Available structures
PDB	Ortholog search: PDBe RCSB
PDB	List of PDB id codes 1EM6, 1EXV, 1FA9, 1FC0, 1L5Q, 1L5R, 1L5S, 1L7X, 1XOI, 2ATI, 2QLL, 2ZB2, 3CEH, 3CEJ, 3CEM, 3DD1, 3DDS, 3DDW
Enzyme activity
EC #	BRENDA	ExPASy	KEGG	MetaCyc
2.4.1.1	↗	↗	↗	↗

Gene location (Human)
Chr.	Chromosome 14 (human)
Band	14q22.1	Start	50,857,891 bp
Band	14q22.1	End	50,944,483 bp

Gene location (Mouse)
Chr.	Chromosome 12 (mouse)
Band	12 C2|12 29.01 cM	Start	70,237,585 bp
Band	12 C2|12 29.01 cM	End	70,278,262 bp
RNA expression pattern
Bgee	Human / Mouse (ortholog); Top expressed in: blood; monocyte; right lobe of liver; bone marrow; adipose tissue; abdominal fat; bone marrow cell; gingival epithelium; palpebral conjunctiva; subcutaneous adipose tissue / Top expressed in: granulocyte; epithelium of lens; tunica adventitia of aorta; left lung lobe; trachea; left lobe of liver; white adipose tissue; brown adipose tissue; tibiofemoral joint; mammary gland; More reference expression data
BioGPS	n/a
Gene ontology
Molecular function	transferase activity; nucleotide binding; glycogen phosphorylase activity; protein homodimerization activity; vitamin binding; glycosyltransferase activity; 1,4-alpha-oligoglucan phosphorylase activity; glucose binding; purine nucleobase binding; bile acid binding; AMP binding; catalytic activity; protein binding; pyridoxal phosphate binding; ATP binding; carbohydrate binding; SHG alpha-glucan phosphorylase activity; linear malto-oligosaccharide phosphorylase activity
Cellular component	cytosol; extracellular exosome; extracellular region; cytoplasm; secretory granule lumen; ficolin-1-rich granule lumen
Biological process	5-phosphoribose 1-diphosphate biosynthetic process; glucose homeostasis; glycogen catabolic process; glycogen metabolic process; necroptosis; metabolism; neutrophil degranulation; carbohydrate metabolic process; response to bacterium
Sources:Amigo / QuickGO
Orthologs
Databases	NCBI: entry; OMA: entry
Species	Human	Mouse
Entrez	5836	110095
Ensembl	ENSG00000100504	ENSMUSG00000021069
UniProt	P06737	Q9ET01
RefSeq (mRNA)	NM_002863; NM_001163940	NM_133198
RefSeq (protein)	NP_001157412; NP_002854	NP_573461
Location (UCSC)	Chr 14: 50.86 – 50.94 Mb	Chr 12: 70.24 – 70.28 Mb
PubMed search
- Wikidata
View/Edit Human	View/Edit Mouse

Glycogen phosphorylase, liver form (PYGL), also known as human liver glycogen phosphorylase (HLGP), is an enzyme that in humans is encoded by the PYGL gene on chromosome 14. This gene encodes a homodimeric protein that catalyses the cleavage of alpha-1,4-glucosidic bonds to release glucose-1-phosphate from liver glycogen stores. This protein switches from inactive phosphorylase B to active phosphorylase A by phosphorylation of serine residue 14. Activity of this enzyme is further regulated by multiple allosteric effectors and hormonal controls. Humans have three glycogen phosphorylase genes that encode distinct isozymes that are primarily expressed in liver, brain and muscle, respectively. The liver isozyme serves the glycemic demands of the body in general while the brain and muscle isozymes supply just those tissues. In glycogen storage disease type VI, also known as Hers disease, mutations in liver glycogen phosphorylase inhibit the conversion of glycogen to glucose and results in moderate hypoglycemia, mild ketosis, growth retardation and hepatomegaly. Alternative splicing results in multiple transcript variants encoding different isoforms [provided by RefSeq, Feb 2011].

== Structure ==
The PYGL gene encodes one of three major glycogen phosphorylase isoforms, which are distinguished by their different structures and subcellular localizations: brain (PYGB), muscle (PYGM), and liver (PYGL). PYGL spans 846 amino acids and shares fairly high homology in amino acid sequence with the other two isozymes, with 73% similarity with PYGM and 74% similarity with PYGB. Nonetheless, PYGB and PYGM demonstrate greater homology to each other, indicating that PYGL evolved by a more distant descent from the common ancestral gene. This protein forms a homodimer, with each monomer composed of N-terminal and C-terminal domains of nearly equal size. The catalytic site forms at the interface between these two domains and interacts with the required cofactor, pyridoxal phosphate, to bind the substrate glycogen. This cofactor is attached by a covalent Schiff base linkage to Lys-680 in the C-terminal domain. At the opposite side of the enzyme, the regulatory face opens up to the cytosol and contains the phosphorylation peptide, which is phosphorylated by phosphorylase kinase and dephosphorylated by the phosphatase PP1, and the AMP site, which is connected to the active site by an adenine loop. Phosphorylation or binding of the allosteric sites induce conformational change that activates the enzyme.

== Function ==
As a glycogen phosphorylase, PYGL catalyzes the phosphorolysis of an α-1, 4-glycosidic bond in glycogen to yield glucose 1-phosphate. Degradation of glycogen The glucose 1-phosphate product then contributes to glycolysis and other biosynthetic functions for energy metabolism. As the major isozyme in liver, PYGL is responsible for maintaining blood glucose homeostasis by regulating the release of glucose 1-phosphate from liver glycogen stores. One model suggests that Ca^{2+} oscillations play a role in activating glycogen phosphorylase in glycogen degradation in liver cells. Through its function in the liver, PYGL is also central to meeting the glycemic demands of the entire body. Though other tissues may express all three forms in different proportions, the purpose of expressing multiple glycogen phosphorylases remains unclear.

== Clinical Significance ==
PYGL has been implicated in glycogen storage disease type VI, also known as Hers disease, and both type 1 and type 2 diabetes. Glycogen storage disease type VI has been attributed to PYGL deficiency as a result of causal mutations in PYGL gene, including two splice-site mutations and two missense mutations. The function of PYGL in regulating liver glucose production also plays a role in diabetes. Since hyperglycemia in type 2 diabetes is the result of excessive glucose production by the liver, developing a drug that targets PYGL may prove effective in controlling blood glucose levels. Glycogen-induced hepatomegaly in type 1 diabetes and glycogen storage disease type VI present similar clinical manifestations such as liver dysfunction, fasting hypoglycemia, and ketosis.

== Interactions ==
=== Inhibitors ===
PYGL has been known to interact with allosteric inhibitors, including Bayer W1807 and sugar derivatives that bind the glucose inhibitor site. In addition, glucose and purines stabilize the inactive conformation of PYGL, thus inhibiting binding to its active site.

== See also ==
- Glycogen phosphorylase
- PYGB
