= 3-O-alpha-D-glucosyl-L-rhamnose phosphorylase =

Class of enzymes

Identifiers
- EC no.: 2.4.1.282

Databases
- IntEnz: IntEnz view
- BRENDA: BRENDA entry
- ExPASy: NiceZyme view
- KEGG: KEGG entry
- MetaCyc: metabolic pathway
- PRIAM: profile
- PDB structures: RCSB PDB PDBe PDBsum
Search
- PMC: articles
- PubMed: articles
- NCBI: proteins

3-O-alpha-D-glucosyl-L-rhamnose phosphorylase (EC 2.4.1.282, cphy1019 (gene)) is an enzyme with systematic name 3-O-alpha-D-glucopyranosyl-L-rhamnopyranose:phosphate beta-D-glucosyltransferase. This enzyme catalyses the following phosphorolysis reaction:

3-O-α-D-Glucopyranosyl-L-rhamnopyranose
P_{i}
P_{i}
L-rhamnopyranose
+
β-D-glucose 1-phosphate

In the reverse reaction, the enzyme is specific for L-rhamnose as acceptor and β-D-glucose 1-phosphate as donor.
