= Maltose synthase =

Class of enzymes

Identifiers
- EC no.: 2.4.1.139
- CAS no.: 81669-74-1

Databases
- IntEnz: IntEnz view
- BRENDA: BRENDA entry
- ExPASy: NiceZyme view
- KEGG: KEGG entry
- MetaCyc: metabolic pathway
- PRIAM: profile
- PDB structures: RCSB PDB PDBe PDBsum
- Gene Ontology: AmiGO / QuickGO
Search
- PMC: articles
- PubMed: articles
- NCBI: proteins

Maltose synthase (EC 2.4.1.139) is an enzyme that catalyzes the chemical reaction which combines two units of α-D-glucose 1-phosphate to form one unit of maltose. The phosphate (P_{i}) groups leave as orthophosphate:

2
α-D-glucose 1-phosphate
H_{2}O
2 P_{i}
maltose

This enzyme characterised from spinach (Spinacia oleracea) belongs to the family of glycosyltransferases, specifically the hexosyltransferases. The systematic name of this enzyme class is alpha-D-glucose-1-phosphate:alpha-D-glucose-1-phosphate 4-alpha-D-glucosyltransferase (dephosphorylating).
