= Phosphoramidate—hexose phosphotransferase =

phosphoramidate-hexose phosphotransferase

Identifiers
- EC no.: 2.7.1.62
- CAS no.: 9031-45-2

Databases
- IntEnz: IntEnz view
- BRENDA: BRENDA entry
- ExPASy: NiceZyme view
- KEGG: KEGG entry
- MetaCyc: metabolic pathway
- PRIAM: profile
- PDB structures: RCSB PDB PDBe PDBsum
- Gene Ontology: AmiGO / QuickGO
Search
- PMC: articles
- PubMed: articles
- NCBI: proteins

Phosphoramidate-hexose phosphotransferase (EC 2.7.1.62) is an enzyme that catalyzes a general chemical reaction which adds a phosphate group to the 1-position of a hexose sugar:

phosphoramidate + hexose $\rightleftharpoons$ NH_{3} + alpha-D-hexose 1-phosphate

For example, D-gluose is converted to α-D-glucose-1-phosphate:

D-glucose
+ phosphoramidic acid
(HO)_{2}P(=O)NH_{2}
NH_{3}
α-D-glucose-1-phosphate

This enzyme is a transferase, specifically one transferring phosphorus-containing groups (phosphotransferases) with an alcohol group as acceptor. The systematic name of this enzyme class is phosphoramidate:hexose 1-phosphotransferase. Other names in common use include phosphoramidate-hexose transphosphorylase, and phosphoramidic-hexose transphosphorylase.
