= Henri G. Hers =

Belgian physiologist and biochemist (1923–2008)

Henri-Géry Hers (23 July 1923 – 14 December 2008) was a Belgian physiologist and biochemist, and a professor at the Universite Catholique de Louvain. He was notable for his work on carbohydrate metabolism and genetic disorders associated with it. An example is Hers' disease - Glycogen storage disease type VI - caused by deficiency of hepatic phosphorylase associated with an enlarged liver and mild hypoglycaemia. In 1966, he was awarded the Francqui Prize on Biological and Medical Sciences, and in 1975 was awarded the Gairdner Foundation International Award of the Gairdner Foundation. In 1988 he was awarded the Wolf Prize in Medicine.
