= ADP-sugar diphosphatase =

Class of enzymes

Identifiers
- EC no.: 3.6.1.21
- CAS no.: 37289-32-0

Databases
- BRENDA: enzyme data
- ExPASy: NiceZyme view
- KEGG: enzyme entry
- MetaCyc: metabolic pathway
- Rhea: reactions
- PDB structures: RCSB PDB PDBe PDBsum
- Gene Ontology: AmiGO / QuickGO
Search
- PMC: articles
- PubMed: articles
- NCBI: proteins

ADP-sugar diphosphatase (EC 3.6.1.21) is a mammalian enzyme that catalyzes the hydrolysis of sugar derivatives of adenosine diphosphate (ADP) to adenosine monophosphate (AMP) and the corresponding sugar phosphate:

ADP-sugar + H_{2}O $\rightleftharpoons$ AMP + alpha-D-aldose 1-phosphate

For example, ADP α-D-glucoside is converted to AMP and glucose 1-phosphate:

ADP α-D-glucoside
H_{2}O
AMP
+
glucose 1-phosphate

When the substrate of the enzyme is ADP-mannose, the enzyme is involved in energy supply in plant fruiting bodies.

This enzyme is a hydrolase, specifically one acting on acid anhydrides in phosphorus-containing anhydrides. The systematic name of this enzyme class is ADP-sugar sugarphosphohydrolase. Other names in common use include ADP-sugar pyrophosphatase, and adenosine diphosphosugar pyrophosphatase.
