= Glycogen phosphorylase, brain form =

PYGB

Identifiers
- Aliases: PYGB, GPBB, phosphorylase, glycogen; brain, glycogen phosphorylase B
- External IDs: OMIM: 138550; MGI: 97828; GeneCards: PYGB
Enzyme activity
EC #	BRENDA	ExPASy	KEGG	MetaCyc
2.4.1.1	↗	↗	↗	↗

Gene location (Human)
Chr.	Chromosome 20 (human)
Band	20p11.21	Start	25,248,085 bp
Band	20p11.21	End	25,298,012 bp

Gene location (Mouse)
Chr.	Chromosome 2 (mouse)
Band	2 G3|2 74.74 cM	Start	150,628,655 bp
Band	2 G3|2 74.74 cM	End	150,673,678 bp
RNA expression pattern
Bgee	Human / Mouse (ortholog); Top expressed in: apex of heart; muscle layer of sigmoid colon; right hemisphere of cerebellum; transverse colon; right coronary artery; popliteal artery; tibial arteries; mucosa of transverse colon; minor salivary glands; right auricle of heart / Top expressed in: transitional epithelium of urinary bladder; right ventricle; myocardium of ventricle; cardiac muscles; motor neuron; facial motor nucleus; atrium; left ventricle; interventricular septum; cardiac muscle tissue of left ventricle; More reference expression data
BioGPS	n/a
Gene ontology
Molecular function	transferase activity; pyridoxal phosphate binding; glycogen phosphorylase activity; protein binding; catalytic activity; 1,4-alpha-oligoglucan phosphorylase activity; glycosyltransferase activity; SHG alpha-glucan phosphorylase activity; linear malto-oligosaccharide phosphorylase activity
Cellular component	cytoplasm; extracellular exosome; membrane; extracellular region; azurophil granule lumen
Biological process	glycogen metabolic process; metabolism; glycogen catabolic process; neutrophil degranulation; carbohydrate metabolic process
Sources:Amigo / QuickGO
Orthologs
Databases	NCBI: entry; OMA: entry
Species	Human	Mouse
Entrez	5834	110078
Ensembl	ENSG00000100994	ENSMUSG00000033059
UniProt	P11216	Q8CI94
RefSeq (mRNA)	NM_002862	NM_153781
RefSeq (protein)	NP_002853	NP_722476
Location (UCSC)	Chr 20: 25.25 – 25.3 Mb	Chr 2: 150.63 – 150.67 Mb
PubMed search
- Wikidata
View/Edit Human	View/Edit Mouse

Glycogen phosphorylase, brain form (PYGB, GPBB), is an enzyme that in humans is encoded by the PYGB gene on chromosome 20. The protein encoded by this gene is a glycogen phosphorylase found predominantly in the brain. The encoded protein forms homodimers, which can associate into homotetramers, the enzymatically active form of glycogen phosphorylase. The activity of this enzyme is positively regulated by AMP and negatively regulated by ATP, ADP, and glucose-6-phosphate. This enzyme catalyzes the rate-determining step in glycogen degradation. [provided by RefSeq, Jul 2008]

== Structure ==
The PYGB gene encodes one of three major glycogen phosphorylase isoforms, which are distinguished by their different structures and subcellular localizations: brain (PYGB), muscle (PYGM), and liver (PYGL). GPBB is the longest of the three isozymes, with a length of 862 residues, due to the extended 3'-UTR at the enzyme's C-terminal. Nonetheless, it shares high homology in amino acid sequence with the other two isozymes, with 83% similarity with PYGM and 80% similarity with PYGL. Moreover, both its nucleotide and amino acid sequences and its codon usage share higher similarity with those of PYGM, thus indicating that the two share a closer evolutionary descent by gene duplication and translocation of a common ancestral gene. A possible pseudogene can be found on chromosome 10.

== Function ==
As a glycogen phosphorylase, GPBB catalyzes the phosphorolysis of glycogen to yield glucose 1-phosphate. This reaction serves as the rate-determining first step in glycogenolysis and, thus, contributes to the regulation of carbohydrate metabolism. In particular, GPBB is responsible for supplying emergency glucose during periods of stress, including anoxia, hypoglycemia, or ischemia. In normal cell conditions, GPBB is bound to the sarcoplasmic reticulum (SR) membrane by complexing with glycogen. When stimulated by stress conditions, Under stress conditions such as hypoxia, glycogen is degraded, and GPBB is released into the cytoplasm. Though GPBB is primarily expressed in adult and fetal brain, it has also been detected in cardiomyocytes and at low levels in other adult and fetal tissues. These other tissues also express PYGL and PYGM, but the purpose of expressing multiple glycogen phosphorylases remains unclear. Nuclear localization was also cited for GPBB in gastrointestinal cancer.

== Clinical significance ==
=== Cancer ===
GPBB overexpression has been associated with several cancers, including colorectal cancer, gastrointestinal cancer, and non-small cell lung cancer (NSCLC). Since GPBB is upregulated during the potential transition of adenoma cells into carcinoma cells, GPBB may be a useful biomarker to detect malignancy potential in precancerous lesions.

=== Ischemia ===
Since GPBB is released from the SR membrane under ischemic conditions, it may serve as a biomarker for early detection of ischemia. Specifically, its release in acute myocardial ischemia has been attributed to increased glycogenolysis and plasma membrane permeability, and has been correlated with poor outcome. As a highly sensitive marker for myocardial ischemia, GPBB may aid in the detection of perioperative myocardial damage and infarction in patients undergoing coronary artery bypass grafting. Meanwhile, GPBB levels are elevated in patients with hypertrophic cardiomyopathy.

== See also ==
- Glycogen phosphorylase
- PYGL
