= Starch phosphorylase =

Enzyme

Starch phosphorylase is a form of phosphorylase similar to glycogen phosphorylase, except that it acts upon starch instead of glycogen.

The plant alpha-glucan phosphorylase, commonly called starch phosphorylase (EC 2.4.1.1), is largely known for the phosphorolytic degradation of starch. Starch phosphorylase catalyzes the reversible transfer of glucosyl units from glucose-1-phosphate to the nonreducing end of alpha-1,4-D-glucan chains with the release of phosphate. Two distinct forms of starch phosphorylase, plastidic phosphorylase and cytosolic phosphorylase, have been consistently observed in higher plants.
