= Urate-ribonucleotide phosphorylase =

Enzyme in purine metabolism

Identifiers
- EC no.: 2.4.2.16
- CAS no.: 9030-29-9

Databases
- IntEnz: IntEnz view
- BRENDA: BRENDA entry
- ExPASy: NiceZyme view
- KEGG: KEGG entry
- MetaCyc: metabolic pathway
- PRIAM: profile
- PDB structures: RCSB PDB PDBe PDBsum
- Gene Ontology: AmiGO / QuickGO
Search
- PMC: articles
- PubMed: articles
- NCBI: proteins

Urate-ribonucleotide phosphorylase (EC 2.4.2.16) is an enzyme that catalyzes the phosphorolysis reaction

3-(β-D-ribofuranosyl)uric acid
P_{i}
α-D-ribose 1-phosphate
+
uric acid

The two substrates of this enzyme found in the small intestine of dogs are 3-(β-D-ribofuranosyl)uric acid and orthophosphate (P_{i}). Its products are α-D-ribose 1-phosphate and uric acid. Enzyme activity in the direction from uric acid to its nucleotide was not shown.

This enzyme belongs to the family of glycosyltransferases, specifically the pentosyltransferases. The systematic name of this enzyme class is urate-ribonucleotide:phosphate alpha-D-ribosyltransferase. Other names in common use include UAR phosphorylase, and urate-ribonucleotide:phosphate D-ribosyltransferase.
