= Alpha,alpha-trehalose phosphorylase =

Class of enzymes

alpha,alpha-trehalose phosphorylase

Identifiers
- EC no.: 2.4.1.64
- CAS no.: 37205-59-7

Databases
- IntEnz: IntEnz view
- BRENDA: BRENDA entry
- ExPASy: NiceZyme view
- KEGG: KEGG entry
- MetaCyc: metabolic pathway
- PRIAM: profile
- PDB structures: RCSB PDB PDBe PDBsum
- Gene Ontology: AmiGO / QuickGO
Search
- PMC: articles
- PubMed: articles
- NCBI: proteins

alpha,alpha-trehalose phosphorylase (EC 2.4.1.64) is an enzyme that catalyzes the chemical reaction

trehalose
P_{i}
P_{i}
β-D-glucose-1-phosphate
+
D-glucose

The two substrates of this enzyme characterised from Euglena gracilis are trehalose and orthophosphate (P_{i}). Its products are β-D-glucose-1-phosphate and D-glucose. The enzyme can act in reverse, producing the disaccharide trehalose.

This enzyme belongs to the family of glycosyltransferases, specifically the hexosyltransferases. The systematic name of this enzyme class is alpha,alpha-trehalose:phosphate beta-D-glucosyltransferase. This enzyme is also called trehalose phosphorylase.
