= Maltose phosphorylase =

Class of enzymes

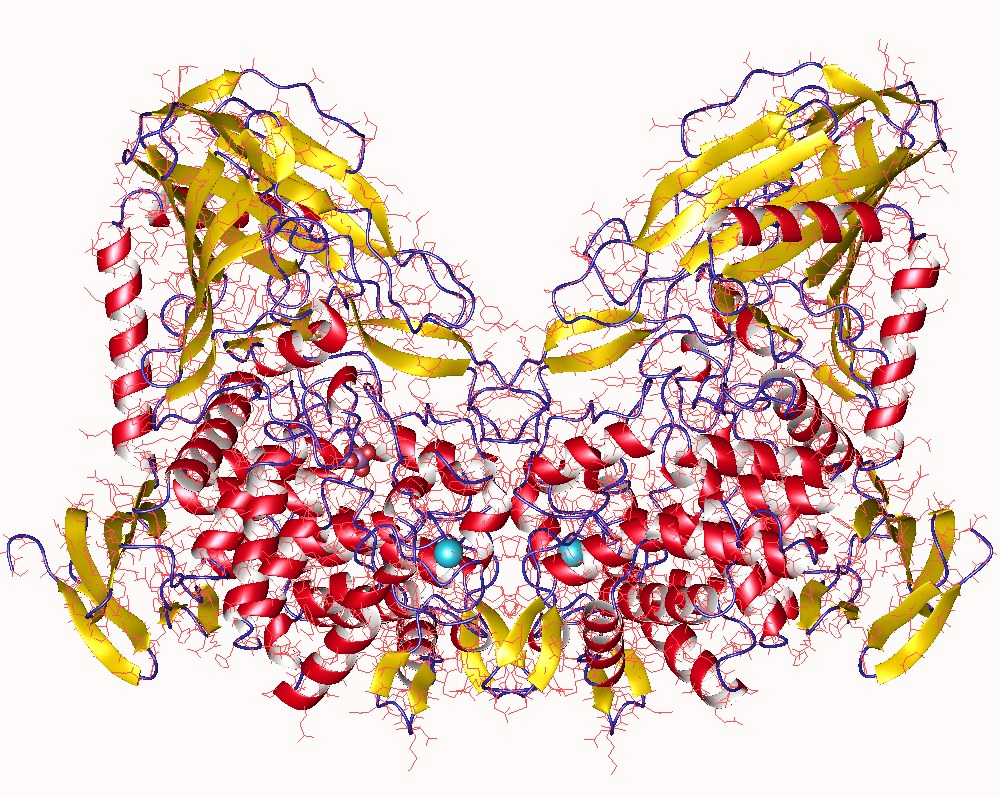
- maltose phosphorylase dimer, Lactobacillus brevis

Identifiers
- EC no.: 2.4.1.8
- CAS no.: 9030-19-7

Databases
- IntEnz: IntEnz view
- BRENDA: BRENDA entry
- ExPASy: NiceZyme view
- KEGG: KEGG entry
- MetaCyc: metabolic pathway
- PRIAM: profile
- PDB structures: RCSB PDB PDBe PDBsum
- Gene Ontology: AmiGO / QuickGO
Search
- PMC: articles
- PubMed: articles
- NCBI: proteins

Maltose phosphorylase (EC 2.4.1.8) is an enzyme that catalyzes the chemical reaction

maltose
P_{i}
D-glucose
+
β-D-glucose 1-phosphate

The two substrates of this enzyme characterised from Neisseria meningitidis and lactobacilli in beer are maltose and orthophosphate (P_{i}). Its products are D-glucose and β-D-glucose 1-phosphate.

This enzyme belongs to the family of glycosyltransferases, specifically the hexosyltransferases. The systematic name of this enzyme class is maltose:phosphate 1-beta-D-glucosyltransferase. This enzyme participates in starch and sucrose metabolism.

== Structural studies ==
As of late 2007, only one structure has been solved for this class of enzymes, with the PDB accession code 1H54.
