= Kojibiose phosphorylase =

Class of enzymes

Identifiers
- EC no.: 2.4.1.230

Databases
- IntEnz: IntEnz view
- BRENDA: BRENDA entry
- ExPASy: NiceZyme view
- KEGG: KEGG entry
- MetaCyc: metabolic pathway
- PRIAM: profile
- PDB structures: RCSB PDB PDBe PDBsum
Search
- PMC: articles
- PubMed: articles
- NCBI: proteins

Kojibiose phosphorylase (EC 2.4.1.230) is an enzyme that catalyzes the chemical reaction

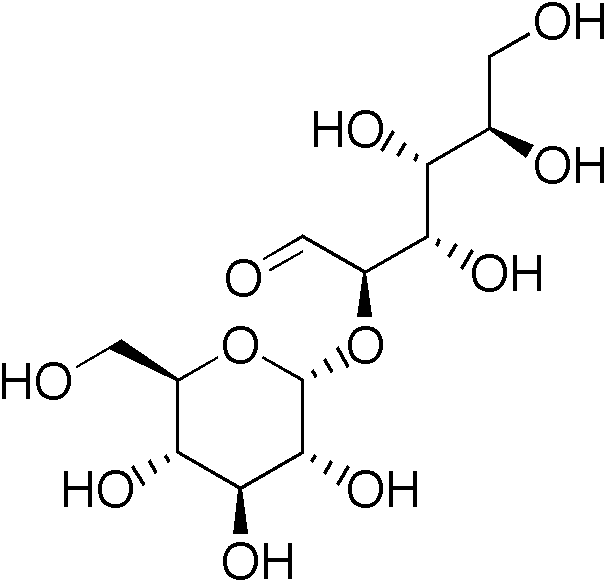
kojibiose
P_{i}
D-glucose
+
β-D-glucose 1-phosphate

The two substrates of this enzyme characterised from Thermoanaerobium brockii are kojibiose and orthophosphate (P_{i}). Its products are D-glucose and β-D-glucose 1-phosphate.

This enzyme belongs to the family of glycosyltransferases, specifically the hexosyltransferases. The systematic name of this enzyme class is 2-alpha-D-glucosyl-D-glucose:phosphate beta-D-glucosyltransferase.
