= Myocarditis =

Inflammation of the heart muscle

- Other names: Inflammatory cardiomyopathy (infectious)
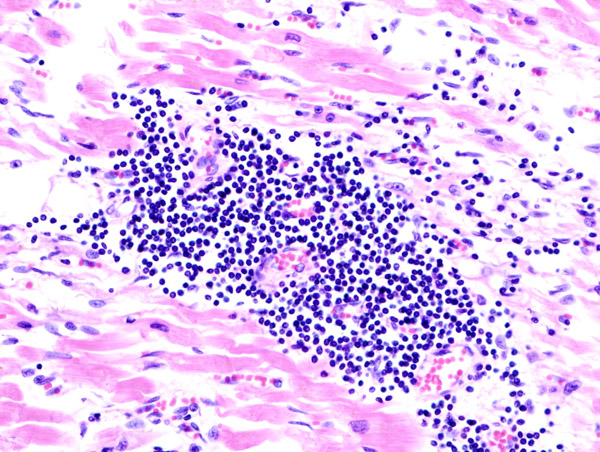
- A microscope image of myocarditis at autopsy in a person with acute onset of heart failure. The dark dots are primarily lymphocytes infiltrating the myocardium.
- Specialty: Infectious disease, cardiology
- Symptoms: Shortness of breath, chest pain, decreased ability to exercise, irregular heartbeat
- Complications: Heart failure due to dilated cardiomyopathy, cardiac arrest
- Duration: Hours to months
- Causes: Usually viral infection, also bacterial infections, certain medications, autoimmune disorders
- Diagnostic method: Electrocardiogram, blood troponin, heart MRI, heart biopsy
- Treatment: Medications, implantable cardiac defibrillator, heart transplant
- Medication: ACE inhibitors, beta blockers, diuretics, corticosteroids, intravenous immunoglobulin
- Prognosis: Variable
- Frequency: 2.5 million with cardiomyopathy (2015)
- Deaths: 354,000 with cardiomyopathy (2015)

Myocarditis is inflammation of the cardiac muscle. Myocarditis can progress to inflammatory cardiomyopathy when there is associated ventricular remodeling and cardiac dysfunction due to chronic inflammation. Symptoms can include shortness of breath, chest pain, decreased ability to exercise, and an irregular heartbeat. The duration of problems can vary from hours to months. Complications may include heart failure, due to dilated cardiomyopathy or cardiac arrest.

Myocarditis is most often due to a viral infection. Other causes include bacterial infections, certain medications, toxins and autoimmune disorders. A diagnosis may be supported by an electrocardiogram (ECG), increased troponin, heart MRI, and occasionally a heart biopsy. An ultrasound of the heart is important to rule out other potential causes, such as heart valve problems.

Treatment depends on both the severity and the cause. Medications such as ACE inhibitors, beta blockers, and diuretics are often used. A period of no exercise is typically recommended during recovery. Corticosteroids or intravenous immunoglobulin (IVIG) may be useful in certain cases. In severe cases, an implantable cardiac defibrillator or heart transplant may be recommended.

In 2013, about 1.5 million cases of acute myocarditis occurred. While people of all ages are affected, the young are most often affected. It is slightly more common in males than females. Most cases are mild. In 2015, cardiomyopathy, including myocarditis, resulted in 354,000 deaths, up from 294,000 in 1990. The initial descriptions of the condition are from the mid-1800s.

== Signs and symptoms ==
The signs and symptoms associated with myocarditis are varied, and relate either to the actual inflammation of the myocardium or to the weakness and dysfunction of the heart muscle that is secondary to the inflammation. While myocarditis may develop over periods ranging from hours to months, patients typically present with signs and symptoms that resemble heart failure, including the following:

Symptoms	Notes	Signs	Notes
Chest pain	Often described as sharp or stabbing in nature	Fever	Especially when infectious, e.g., from parvovirus B19
Shortness of breath	Worse when lying down or in a prone position	Dull heart sounds	Muffling occurs with inflammation, especially with pericarditis
Palpitations	Feeling like one's heart is beating forcefully	Abnormal heart rhythm	Determined using an electrocardiogram
Dizziness or fainting	Can reflect inadequate blood flow to the brain	Damage to heart cells	Seen as elevated troponin and inflammation on imaging

Since myocarditis is often due to a viral illness, many patients experience symptoms consistent with a recent viral infection including a fever, rash, loss of appetite, abdominal pain, vomiting, diarrhea, joint pains, and easily becoming tired. Additionally, myocarditis is often associated with pericarditis, and many people with myocarditis present with signs and symptoms that suggest myocarditis and pericarditis at the same time.

Children primarily present with the aforementioned symptoms associated with a viral infection. Later stages of the illness can involve the respiratory system and lead to increased work of breathing. These are often mistaken for asthma.

Myocarditis can be distinguished as either fulminant or acute based on the severity of symptoms on presentation, as well as the time course over which symptoms develop and persist. This categorization can help predict the treatment, outcomes, and complications of myocarditis.

Fulminant myocarditis is defined as sudden and severe myocarditis that is associated with signs and symptoms of heart failure while at rest. More specifically, fulminant myocarditis is characterized by a distinct, rapid onset of severe heart failure symptoms, such as shortness of breath and chest pain, that develop over the course of hours to days. Additionally, treatment requires the use of medications or mechanical devices to improve heart function.

Acute non-fulminant myocarditis has a less distinct onset in contrast to fulminant myocarditis, and evolves over days to months. While the symptoms of acute myocarditis overlap with those of fulminant myocarditis, they do not typically occur at rest, and treatment does not require the use of mechanical circulatory support.

== Causes ==
While many causes of myocarditis are known, there are many cases in which a causative agent cannot be identified. In Europe and North America, viruses are common culprits. Worldwide, however, the most common cause is Chagas disease, an illness endemic to Central and South America that results from infection with the protozoan Trypanosoma cruzi. Overall, myocarditis can be caused by infections, immune conditions, toxins, drug reactions, and physical injuries to the heart.

=== Infections ===
The most common causes of myocarditis are infectious organisms. Viral infections are the most common cause in developed countries, with a majority of cases being caused by those with single-stranded RNA genomes, such as Coxsackie viruses (especially Coxsackie B3 and B5). Globally, Chagas disease is the leading cause of myocarditis, which results from infection with the protozoan Trypanosoma cruzi. Bacteria can also result in myocarditis, although it is rare in patients with normal heart function and without a preexisting immunodeficiency. A list of the most relevant infectious organisms is below.

- Viral: adenovirus, parvovirus B19, coxsackie virus, rubella virus, polio virus, Epstein–Barr virus, hepatitis C virus, influenza virus and severe acute respiratory syndrome coronavirus 2 (SARS‑CoV‑2, causing COVID-19)
- Protozoan: Trypanosoma cruzi and Toxoplasma gondii (causing Chagas disease and toxoplasmosis, respectively)
- Bacterial: Brucella, Corynebacterium diphtheriae, Neisseria gonorrhoeae, Haemophilus influenzae, Actinomyces, Tropheryma whipplei, Vibrio cholerae, Borrelia burgdorferi, Leptospira, Rickettsia, Mycoplasma pneumoniae
- Fungal: Aspergillus
- Parasitic: Ascaris, Echinococcus granulosus, Paragonimus westermani, Schistosoma, Taenia solium, Trichinella spiralis, visceral larva migrans, Wuchereria bancrofti

=== Immune conditions ===
- Allergic reaction (e.g., to acetazolamide or amitriptyline)
- Kawasaki disease
- Autoimmunity (scleroderma, lupus, sarcoidosis, and systemic vasculitides)
- Toxic shock syndrome

=== Drug reactions and toxins ===
- Anthracyclines and other forms of chemotherapy
- Antipsychotics including clozapine
- Alcohol
- Stimulants such as mephedrone and cocaine
- Arsenic
- Carbon monoxide
- Snake venom
- Heavy metals (copper or iron)

==== Vaccination ====
- Myocarditis and pericarditis can be a side effect of some vaccines like the smallpox vaccine.
- Myocarditis can be a side-effect of the Covid-19 mRNA vaccines. The FDA and European Medicines Agency estimates the risk of myocarditis after the Covid-19 vaccine as 1 case per 100,000 of those who are vaccinated. The risk of myocarditis after Covid-19 vaccination was observed to be highest in males between 16–29 years of age, and after receiving the second dose of the mRNA Covid-19 vaccine. For this group, incidence of myocarditis has been reported to be between 1 case in 2500 to 1 case per 10,000.

=== Physical injuries ===
- Electric shock
- Hyperpyrexia, and radiation

== Mechanism ==
Most forms of myocarditis involve the infiltration of heart tissues by one or two types of pro-inflammatory blood cells, lymphocytes and macrophages plus two respective descendants of these cells, NK cells and macrophages. Eosinophilic myocarditis is a subtype of myocarditis in which cardiac tissue is infiltrated by another type of pro-inflammatory blood cell, the eosinophil. Eosinophilic myocarditis is further distinguished from non-eosinophilic myocarditis by having a different set of causes and recommended treatments.

The pathophysiology of viral myocarditis is not well understood, but it is believed to involve cardiotropic viruses (viruses with a high affinity for the heart muscle) gaining entry to cardiac muscle cells, usually via binding to a transmembrane receptor. Over approximately the next 1–7 days the virus replicates and causes inflammation leadings to necrosis and apoptosis of cardiac muscle cells (myocytes) and activation of the innate immune system. Over the next 1–4 weeks, viral replication continues with subsequent activation of the acquired immune system leading to T cell infiltration and the formation of antibodies, including possibly auto-antibodies. Over the next few months to years, this process either resolves and concludes with viral clearance or it may progress to cause permanent heart damage such as dilated cardiomyopathy, ventricular dysfunction or other cardiomyopathies. Coxsackie B, specifically B3 and B5, has been found to interact with coxsackievirus-adenovirus receptor (CAR) and decay-accelerating factor (DAF). However, other proteins have also been identified that allow Coxsackieviruses to bind to cardiac cells. The natural function of CAR and mechanism that the Coxsackievirus uses to infect the cardiac muscle is still unknown. The mechanism by which coxsackie B viruses (CBVs) trigger inflammation is believed to be through the recognition of CBV virions by Toll-like receptors.

The binding of many types of coronaviruses, including the SARS-CoV-2 virus, through ACE2 receptors present in heart muscle may be responsible for direct viral injury leading to myocarditis. In a study done during the 2002–2004 SARS outbreak, SARS viral RNA was detected in the autopsy of heart specimens in 35% of the patients in the Toronto, Canada area who had died due to SARS. It was also observed that an already diseased heart has increased expression of ACE2 receptor contrasted to healthy individuals which may lead to greater viral infiltration in the heart muscle. Hyperactive immune responses in COVID-19 patients may lead to the initiation of the cytokine storm. This excess release of cytokines may lead to myocardial injury. In addition to direct cardiac myocyte (heart muscle cell) damage due to SARS-CoV-2 viral infiltration and inflammation, there are other suspected mechanisms that COVID-19 may indirectly cause myocarditis. During COVID-19, the other indirect mechanisms thought to contribute to myocarditis include: oxygen supply-demand mismatch to the heart muscle leading to myocardial (heart muscle) injury; microvascular thrombi, or blood clots in the small blood vessels of the heart causing injury; the systemic hyperinflammatory state in Covid-19 leading to heart muscle injury; or the virus causing indirect damage to the heart by inducing auto-immune mediated damage to the heart muscle (and frequently other organs).

== Diagnosis ==
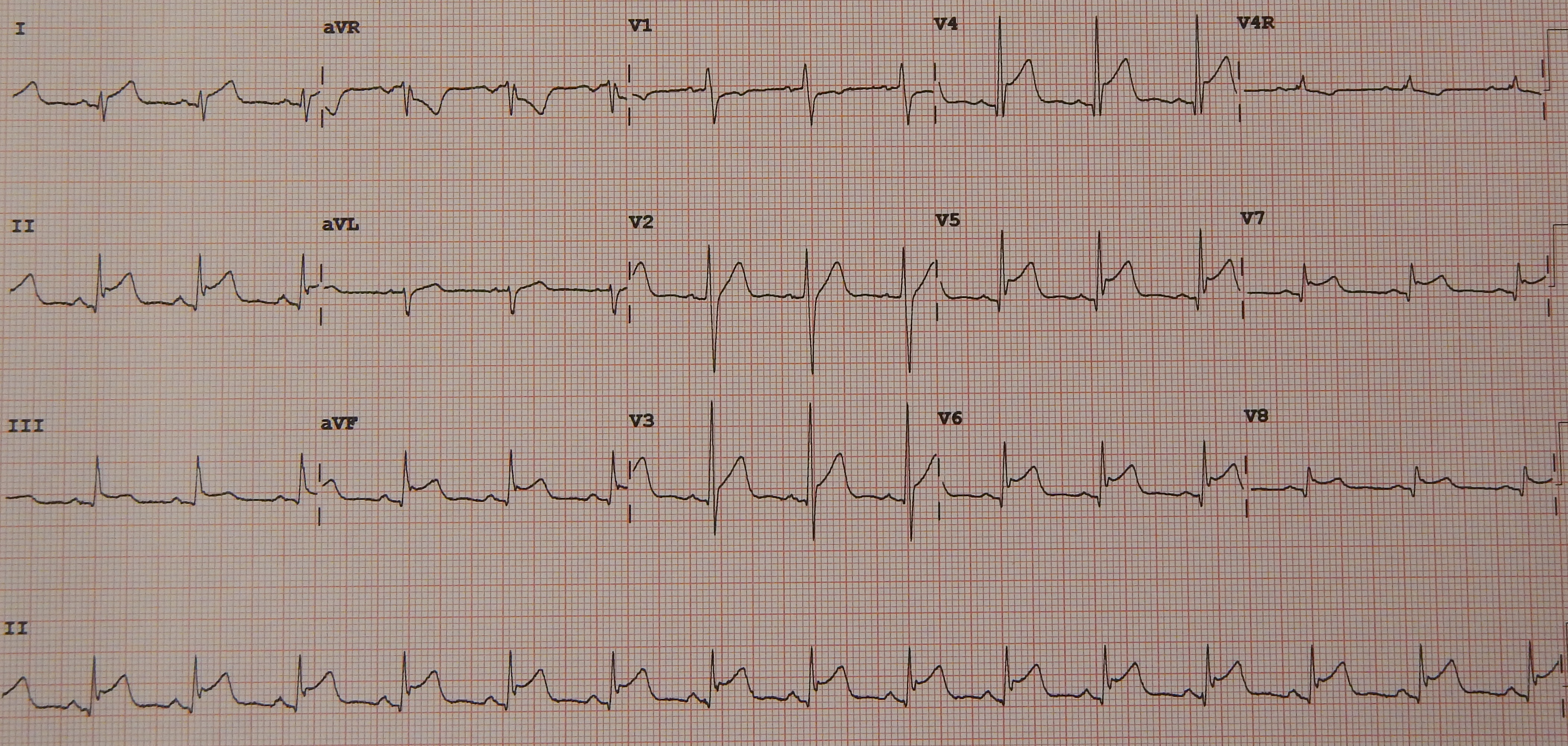
Diffuse ST elevation in a young male due to myocarditis and pericarditis

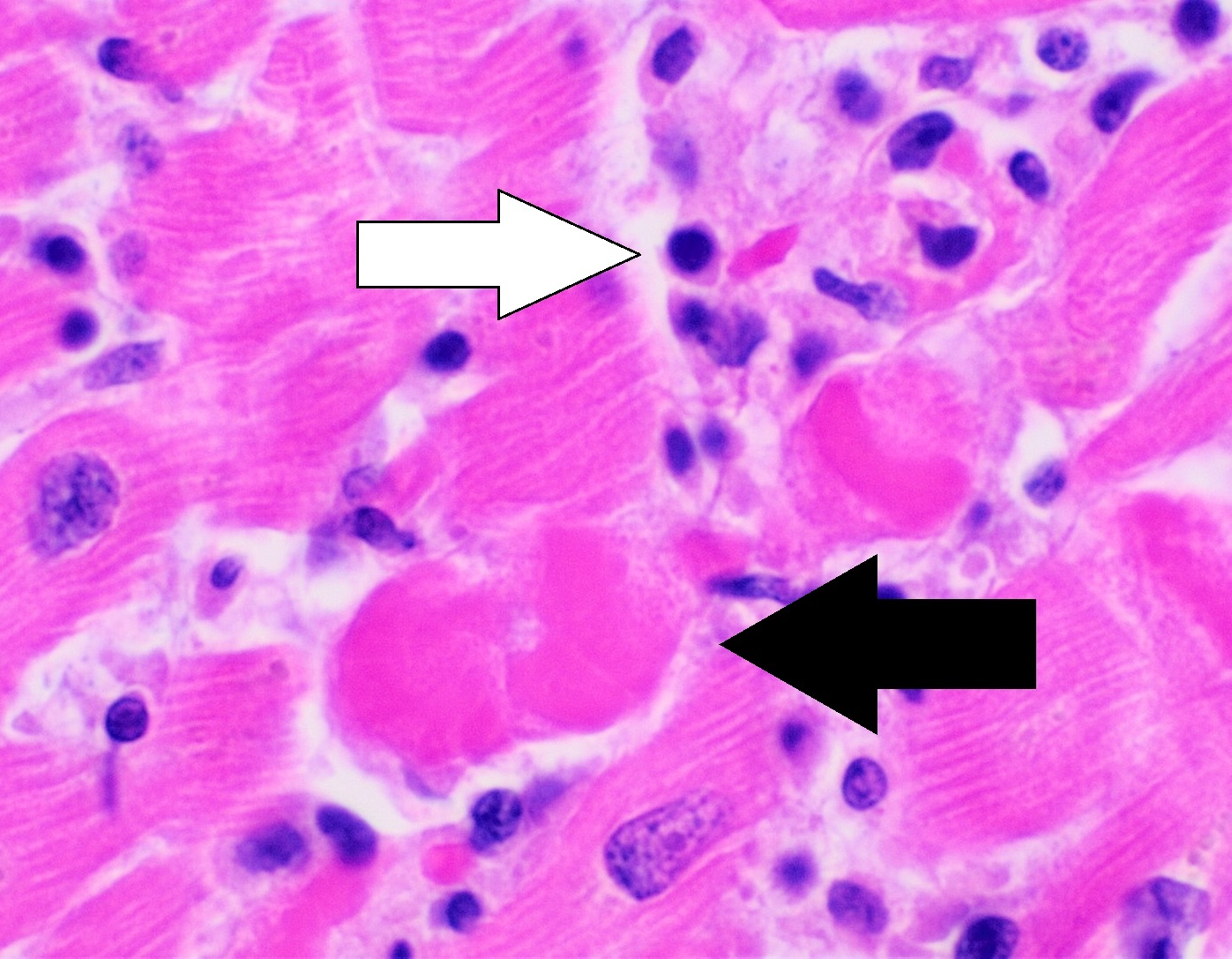
Lymphocytic myocarditis (white arrow points to a lymphocyte), commonly showing myocyte necrosis (black arrow), seen as hypereosinophilic cytoplasm with loss of striations.

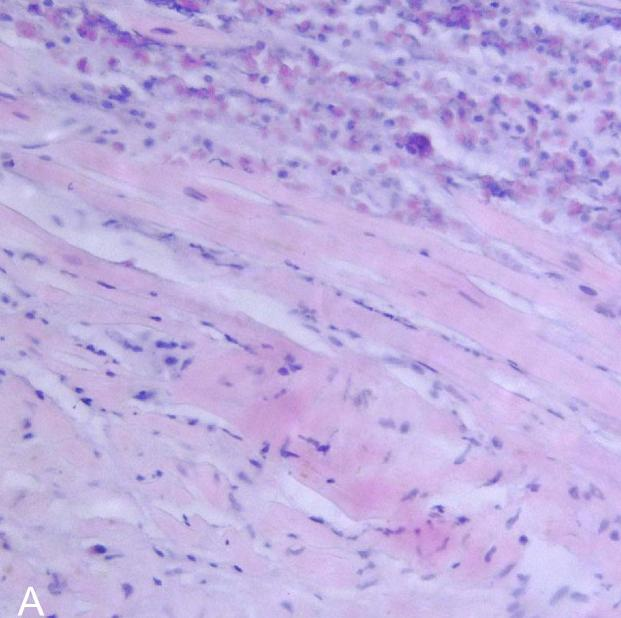
Endomyocardial biopsy specimen with extensive eosinophilic infiltrate involving the endocardium and myocardium (hematoxylin and eosin stain)

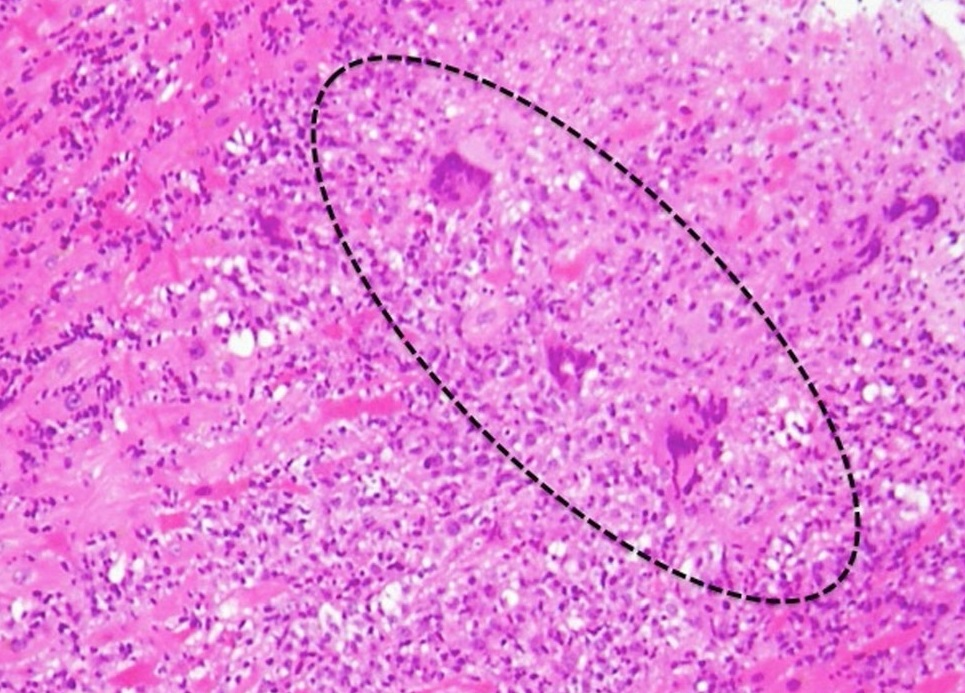
Giant-cell myocarditis, with multinucleated giant cells.

Myocarditis refers to an underlying process that causes inflammation and injury of the heart. It does not refer to inflammation of the heart as a consequence of some other insult. Many secondary causes, such as a heart attack, can lead to inflammation of the myocardium and therefore the diagnosis of myocarditis cannot be made by evidence of inflammation of the myocardium alone.

Myocardial inflammation can be suspected on the basis of elevated inflammatory markers including C-reactive protein (CRP), erythrocyte sedimentation rate (ESR), or an increased IgM (serology) against viruses known to affect the myocardium. Markers of myocardial damage (troponin or creatine kinase cardiac isoenzymes) are elevated. The CRP and ESR are sometimes elevated in myocarditis but they are not specific as they may be elevated due to many other causes. Similarly, CK may be elevated in myocarditis but is also non-specific, as it may be elevated in myositis (skeletal muscle injury). High sensitivity troponin is usually elevated in myocarditis and this marker is very specific to myocardial (heart muscle) injury.

Myocardial inflammation may also be suspected based on ECG findings, but these findings are not specific to myocarditis. The ECG finding most commonly seen in myocarditis is sinus tachycardia with non-specific ST or T wave changes. But other findings that may be seen in perimyocarditis (a combination of pericarditis and myocarditis) include PR segment depression, PR segment depression with associated ST segment elevation, diffuse ST segment elevation (in a pericarditis pattern). ST segment elevation was seen in 62% of people with myocarditis. The presence of Q waves, a widened QRS complex, prolongation of the QT interval, high degree AV nodal blockade, and ventricular tachyarrhythmias are associated with a poor prognosis when seen on ECG in people with myocarditis.

The gold standard is the biopsy of the myocardium, in general done in the setting of angiography. A small tissue sample of the endocardium and myocardium is taken and investigated. The cause of the myocarditis can be only identified by a biopsy. Endomyocardial biopsy samples are assessed for histopathology (how the tissue looks like under the microscope): myocardial interstitium may show abundant edema and inflammatory infiltrate, rich in lymphocytes and macrophages. Focal destruction of myocytes explains the myocardial pump failure. In addition samples may be assessed with immunohistochemistry to determine which types of immune cells are involved in the reaction and how they are distributed. Furthermore, PCR and/or RT-PCR may be performed to identify particular viruses. Finally, further diagnostic methods like microRNA assays and gene-expression profile may be performed.

Cardiac magnetic resonance imaging (cMRI or CMR) has been shown to be very useful in diagnosing myocarditis by visualizing markers for inflammation of the myocardium. Cardiac MRI is most sensitive when performed 2–3 weeks after the initial clinical presentation of myocarditis and may be repeated 6–12 months after onset to monitor the evolution of disease or response to treatment. The Lake Louise Criteria (established in 2009) are a commonly used MRI criteria to establish the diagnosis of myocarditis in suspected cases. The Lake Louise Criteria include increased signal intensity after gadolinium contrast enhancement (a sign of hyperemia, or increased blood flow to damaged tissue), increased myocardial T2 relaxation time or an increased T2 signal intensity (which are signs of tissue edema or swelling), and late gadolinium contrast enhancement (which is a sign of tissue necrosis (tissue damage) or fibrosis (scarring)). In 2018, additional radiographic MRI criteria were added, including increased T1 signal intensity and increased extracellular volume (both of which being signs of myocardial injury). The original 2009 Lake Louise Criteria had a 74% sensitivity and 86% specificity in the diagnosis of myocarditis, but when adding the 2018 update to the criteria (in which T1 signal intensity was found to have high diagnostic sensitivity), the sensitivity and specificity in the diagnosis of myocarditis increased to 88% and 96% respectively. Cardiac MRI, if available, is recommended in all cases of suspected myocarditis.

Ultrasound showing cardiogenic shock due to myocarditis

Ultrasound showing cardiogenic shock due to myocarditis

Ultrasound showing cardiogenic shock due to myocarditis

== Treatment ==
While myocarditis has many etiologies and a variable constellation of signs and symptoms, many causes do not have a specific treatment thus the primary focus is on supportive care and symptom management. In some cases of biopsy-proven myocarditis, the causative cell type may indicate condition specific treatments that are beneficial. These treatments typically consist of corticosteroids, or immunosuppressants. Eosinophilic myocarditis, giant cell myocarditis and cardiac sarcoidosis are usually responsive to immunosuppressive treatments; in the form of glucocorticoids with or without azathioprine and cyclosporine. Some of these immune mediated forms of myocarditis require an extended course (maintenance course) of immunosuppressive therapy. It is recommended to rule out drugs and parasites as potential causes of eosinophilic myocarditis as these common causes of the variant can be effectively treated with discontinuation of the offending drug or specific anti-parasitic treatment respectively. Empiric IV glucocorticoids are indicated in acute myocarditis with cardiogenic shock, heart failure, ventricular arrhythmias or high degree AV block that is suspected due to auto-immune disease; but the European Society of Cardiology also recommends subsequent viral genome testing of endomyocardial biopsy specimens due to risk of viral activation, which may necessitate discontinuation of immunosuppression therapy.

In a majority of cases, the main therapies are used to support patients and are dependent on the severity of symptoms and the time course across which myocarditis develops. Supportive therapies can be divided into two broad categories, medications and mechanical support.

=== Medication ===
The specific medications that are used to support patients are directly related to the cause of the symptom or sign. Just as the symptoms of myocarditis mirror those of congestive heart failure, so too do the therapies. Additionally, the order in which therapies are used depends on the degree of heart dysfunction, with stabilization of patient blood pressure and breathing taking highest priority when present. This can involve the use of inotropes, or medications that make the heart contract with greater force, as well as antiarrhythmic drugs such as adenosine or carvedilol. In patients that have stable and adequate heart function, further treatments are based on heart failure guidelines. ACE inhibitors or Angiotensin Receptor Blockers (ARBs) can have a protective benefit to the heart, so either are typically used in any patient with symptomatic myocarditis. Simultaneously, beta blockers are used in patients that can tolerate their heart beating at a slower rate. Shortness of breath at rest and swelling can be relieved with diuretics such as furosemide, and the addition of aldosterone receptor blockers can augment the diuresis while preventing the excess loss of potassium. In patients with symptoms while resting, additional medications can be added such as digoxin.

=== Mechanical support ===
Mechanical support is used in cases of myocarditis in which medications alone do not lead to adequate heart function and the body requires additional support to achieve organ perfusion. Myocarditis cases that require mechanical circulatory support are categorized as fulminant by definition. People that require additional support with their heart function can benefit from the use of ventricular assist devices like intra-aortic balloon pumps. In people with myocarditis severe enough to cause cardiac arrest, extracorporeal membrane oxygenation (ECMO) is used to adequately pump blood and provide oxygen if needed. Both ventricular assist devices and ECMO can be used as bridge therapy until heart transplantation in patients that are candidates. Heart transplantation is reserved for those that do not respond to the aforementioned conventional medical therapies. An implantable cardioverter-defibrillator (ICD) is sometimes required in those with cardiomyopathy or heart failure caused by myocarditis due to the risk of fatal ventricular arrhythmias. The need for ICD is usually assessed 3–6 months after the onset of myocarditis, after the acute phase of myocarditis has passed, with a temporary, wearable cardioverter-defibrillator acting as a temporary treatment in the interim.

== Prognosis ==
The prognosis associated with myocarditis is stratified by the severity and time course along which symptoms develop. In addition to symptom severity, there are also several indicators of heart function that can be used to predict patient outcomes, many of which are part of the standard evaluation of patients presenting with cardiovascular dysfunction. Most people with myocarditis have an uncomplicated, self-limited and mild course while making a full recovery. However, those with myocarditis that present with a decreased ejection fraction, or those who present with heart failure, advanced atrioventricular block, with sustained ventricular arrhythmias or with hemodynamic instability have a worse prognosis with an increased risk of death or need for heart transplantation.

An electrocardiogram is one of the most common screening tools used in cases of suspected cardiac pathology, such as myocarditis. The findings that correlate with poorer outcomes are non-specific and include widened QRS complexes and QT intervals, partial or complete atrial-ventricular heart block, and malignant ventricular arrhythmias like sustained ventricular tachycardia or ventricular fibrillation. Electrocardiogram findings of ST elevations with upward concavity and an early repolarization pattern, however, were associated with a better cardiovascular prognosis in general.

In cases of acute myocarditis, cardiac magnetic resonance imaging can reveal several prognostic indicators that, similar to ECGs, are non-specific and reflect poorer cardiac physiology. Late gadolinium enhancement on cardiac MRI demonstrates perturbations in extracellular volume as a result of cell necrosis or edema, and is significantly associated with increases in all-cause mortality, cardiovascular mortality, and major adverse cardiovascular events. The association was strongest with any late gadolinium enhancement, but remained true for findings of anterolateral-specific enhancement. A similar relationship was found between a left ventricular ejection fraction < 50%, increased mortality, and increased major adverse cardiovascular events.

Myocarditis has been reported to be a major cause of sudden cardiac death (SCD) in infants, adolescents, and young adults, but the reported rates show wide variation (1 to 14 percent) among young people depending on differences in SCD definition and classification/ definition of myocarditis post-mortem as well as heterogeneity of study populations.

In fulminant myocarditis, in which an inflammatory cytokine storm occurs, cardiac functions decline rapidly and the death rate is high.

== Epidemiology ==
The prevalence of myocarditis is estimated to be about 1–10 cases per 100,000 persons per year, with higher estimates at 22 cases per 100,000 persons annually. The highest incidence of myocarditis is seen in men between the ages of 20 and 40. Fulminant myocarditis, the most severe subtype, has been shown to occur in up to 2.5% of known myocarditis presentations. When looking at different causes of myocarditis, viral infection is the most prevalent, especially in children; however, the prevalence rate of myocarditis is often underestimated as the condition is easily overlooked and is sometimes asymptomatic. Viral myocarditis being an outcome of viral infection depends heavily on genetic host factors and the pathogenicity unique to the virus. If one tests positive for an acute viral infection, clinical developments have discovered that 1–5% of said population may show some form of myocarditis.

In regard to the population affected, myocarditis is more common in pregnant women, children, and those who are immunocompromised. Myocarditis, however, has shown to be more common in the male population than in the female. Multiple studies report a 1:1.3–1.7 female-male ratio of prevalence of myocarditis. In young adults, up to 20% of all cases of sudden death are due to myocarditis. Young males specifically have a higher incidence rate than any other population due to their testosterone levels creating a greater inflammatory response that increases the chance of cardiac pathologies. While males tend to have a higher risk of developing myocarditis, females tend to display more severe signs and symptoms, such as ventricular tachycardia and ventricular fibrillation, but do so at an older age. Among patients with HIV, myocarditis is the most common cardiac pathological finding at autopsy, with a prevalence of 50% or more.

Myocarditis is the third most common cause of death among young adults with a cumulative incidence rate globally of 1.5 cases per 100,000 persons annually. Myocarditis accounts for approximately 20% of sudden cardiac death in a variety of populations, including adults under the age of 40, young athletes, United States Air Force recruits, and elite Swedish orienteers. With individuals who develop myocarditis, the first year is difficult as a collection of cases have shown there is a 20% mortality rate.

=== Myocarditis and COVID-19 ===
Myocarditis can be seen during COVID-19, the disease caused by the SARS-CoV-2 virus; with the myocarditis being associated with a spectrum of severities from asymptomatic to fulminant. The symptoms for myocarditis following a COVID-19 infection can present as chest pain, shortness of breath, fatigue, and irregular heartbeats which can make the accurate diagnosis of myocarditis challenging. In one cohort study, comparing the autopsy reports of 277 hearts of people who died from COVID-19, clinically significant myocarditis was seen in approximately 2% of hearts. Other estimates of the incidence of myocarditis in those with COVID-19 range from 2.4 cases of definite/probable myocarditis (based on clinical criteria) per 1,000 people with COVID-19 to 4.1 cases per 1,000 persons in those who are hospitalized with COVID-19.

Although myocarditis is relatively rare in those with COVID-19, when it is present it is likely to follow a severe and fulminant course for those previously hospitalized with COVID-19. Of those with COVID-19 and myocarditis, 39% presented with severe myocarditis associated with hemodynamic instability, needing mechanical circulation support or other major interventions. Severe myocarditis in COVID-19 is also more likely in those who have COVID-19 pneumonia.

Myocarditis is a rare adverse side effect from mRNA COVID-19 vaccines.

== History ==
Cases of myocarditis have been documented as early as the 1600s, but the term "myocarditis", implying an inflammatory process of the myocardium, was introduced by German physician Joseph Friedrich Sobernheim in 1837. However, the term has been confused with other cardiovascular conditions, such as hypertension and ischemic heart disease. Following admonition regarding the indiscriminate use of myocarditis as a diagnosis from authorities such as British cardiologist Sir Thomas Lewis and American cardiologist and co-founder of the American Heart Association Paul White, myocarditis was under-diagnosed.

Although myocarditis is clinically and pathologically clearly defined as "inflammation of the myocardium", its definition, classification, diagnosis, and treatment are subject to continued controversy, but endomyocardial biopsy has helped define the natural history of myocarditis and clarify clinicopathological correlations.

== See also ==
- Viral cardiomyopathy
- Eosinophilic myocarditis
- Myopericarditis
