= Beta-phosphoglucomutase =

Enzyme

β-Phosphoglucomutase

Identifiers
- EC no.: 5.4.2.6
- CAS no.: 68651-99-0

Databases
- IntEnz: IntEnz view
- BRENDA: BRENDA entry
- ExPASy: NiceZyme view
- KEGG: KEGG entry
- MetaCyc: metabolic pathway
- PRIAM: profile
- PDB structures: RCSB PDB PDBe PDBsum
- Gene Ontology: AmiGO / QuickGO
Search
- PMC: articles
- PubMed: articles
- NCBI: proteins

In enzymology, a β-phosphoglucomutase (EC 5.4.2.6) is an enzyme that catalyzes the chemical reaction

β-D-glucose 1-phosphate $\rightleftharpoons$ β-D-glucose 6-phosphate

Hence, this enzyme has one substrate, β-D-glucose 1-phosphate, and one product, β-D-glucose 6-phosphate.

This enzyme belongs to the family of isomerases, specifically the phosphotransferases (phosphomutases), which transfer phosphate groups within a molecule. The systematic name of this enzyme class is beta-D-glucose 1,6-phosphomutase. This enzyme participates in starch and sucrose metabolism.

== Structural studies ==
20 structures have been solved for this enzyme PDB. Some of the accession codes are 1LVH, 1O03, 1O08, 1Z4N, 1Z4O, and 1ZOL. Most of these structures detail metal fluoride analogue complexes which are used to mimic different states along the reaction coordinate.
