= N-terminal glutamine amidase 1 =

Enzyme found in humans

NTAQ1

Identifiers
- Aliases: NTAQ1, C8orf32, WDYHV motif containing 1, N-terminal glutamine amidase 1, WDYHV1
- External IDs: MGI: 1924023; GeneCards: NTAQ1
Available structures
PDB	Ortholog search: PDBe RCSB
PDB	List of PDB id codes 3C9Q, 4W79
Enzyme activity
EC #	BRENDA	ExPASy	KEGG	MetaCyc
3.5.1.122	↗	↗	↗	↗

Gene location (Human)
Chr.	Chromosome 8 (human)
Band	8q24.13	Start	123,416,726 bp
Band	8q24.13	End	123,470,028 bp

Gene location (Mouse)
Chr.	Chromosome 15 (mouse)
Band	15 D1|15	Start	58,004,773 bp
Band	15 D1|15	End	58,022,061 bp
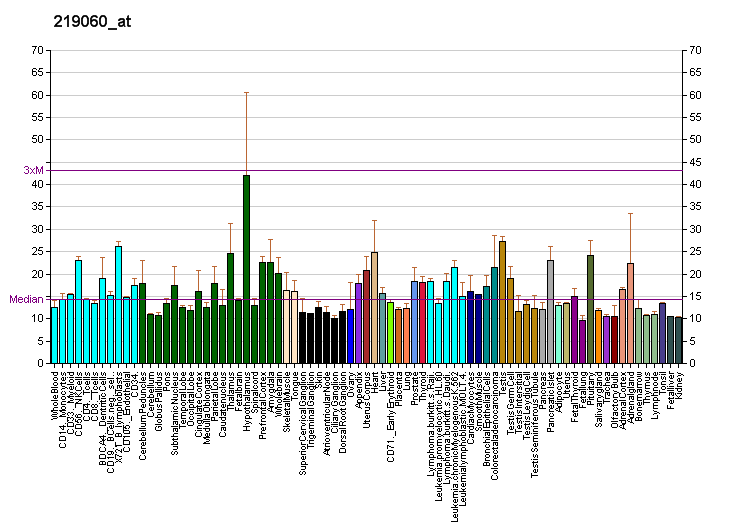
RNA expression pattern
Bgee	Human / Mouse (ortholog); Top expressed in: ganglionic eminence; secondary oocyte; lateral nuclear group of thalamus; gonad; islet of Langerhans; pons; left ventricle; gastrocnemius muscle; C1 segment; ventricular zone / Top expressed in: bone marrow; thymus; granulocyte; pancreas; spleen; adrenal gland; epiblast; islet of Langerhans; genital tubercle; ileum; More reference expression data
BioGPS	More reference expression data
Orthologs
Databases	NCBI: entry; OMA: entry
Species	Human	Mouse
Entrez	55093	76773
Ensembl	ENSG00000156795	ENSMUSG00000022359
UniProt	Q96HA8	Q80WB5
RefSeq (mRNA)	NM_001283024; NM_001283027; NM_018024	NM_029734; NM_001326599; NM_001326602
RefSeq (protein)	NP_001269953; NP_001269956; NP_060494	NP_001313528; NP_001313531; NP_084010
Location (UCSC)	Chr 8: 123.42 – 123.47 Mb	Chr 15: 58 – 58.02 Mb
PubMed search
- Wikidata
View/Edit Human	View/Edit Mouse

N-terminal glutamine amidase 1 is an enzyme that in humans is encoded by the NTAQ1 gene (previously WDYHV1).
