= Guizar–Vasquez–Sanchez–Manzano syndrome =

Guizar-Vazquez-Sanchez-Manzano syndrome
- Other names: Dysmorphism-pectus carinatum-joint laxity syndrome
- Specialty: Medical genetics
- Frequency: Extremely rare, only two cases have ever been reported

Guizar-Vasquez-Sanchez-Manzano syndrome is an extremely rare genetic and congenital disorder that is characterized by facial dysmorphisms (more specifically, chubby cheeks, mild frontal bossing, a beaked nose with an accompanying low nasal bridge, malar hypoplasia, peculiar philtrums and upper lips), pectus carinatum, and joint hypermobility. Only 2 cases have ever been reported in medical literature, with both of those cases coming from siblings of the same family.
