= Idiopathic giant-cell myocarditis =

- Other names: IGCM
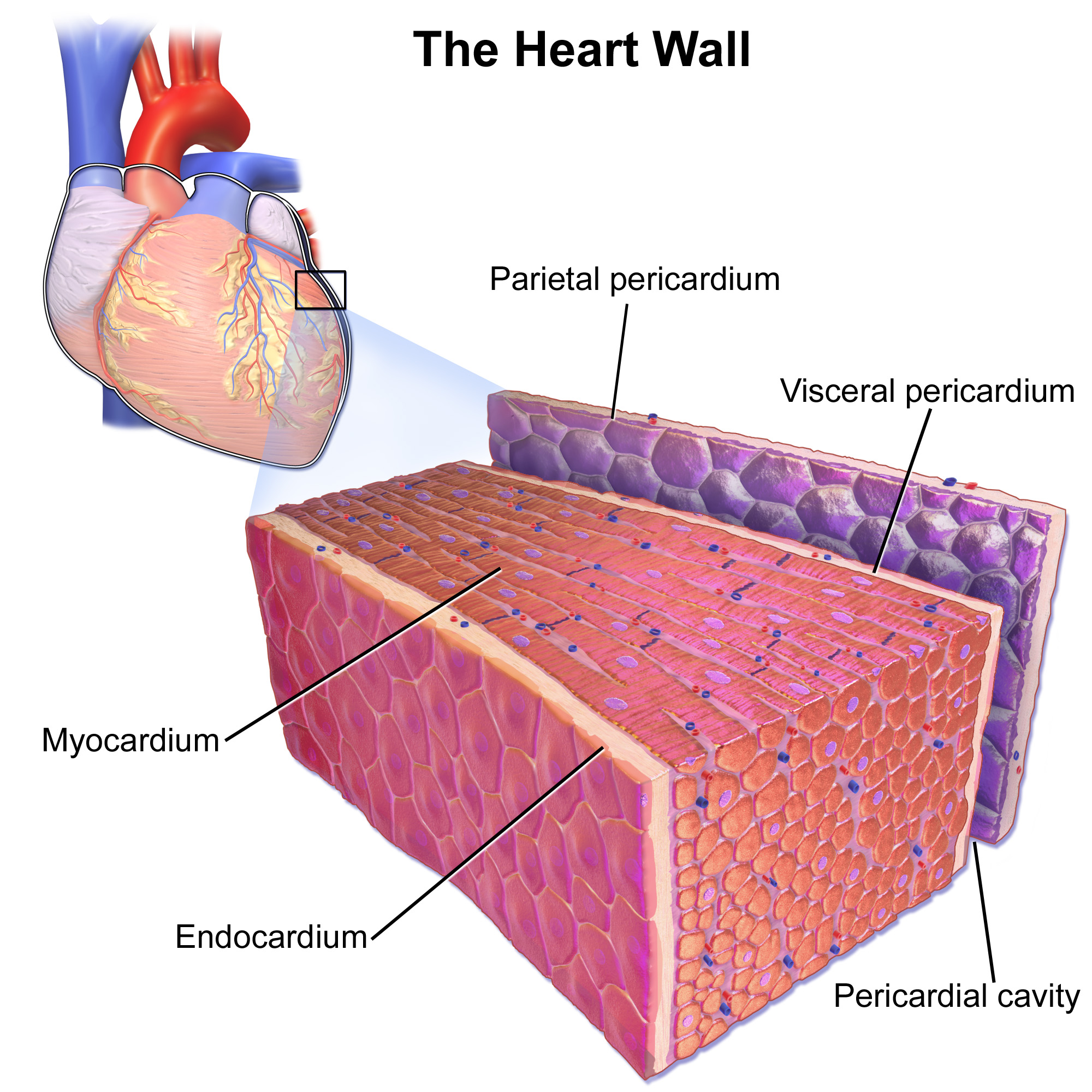
- Myocardium is affected by this condition
- Specialty: Cardiology

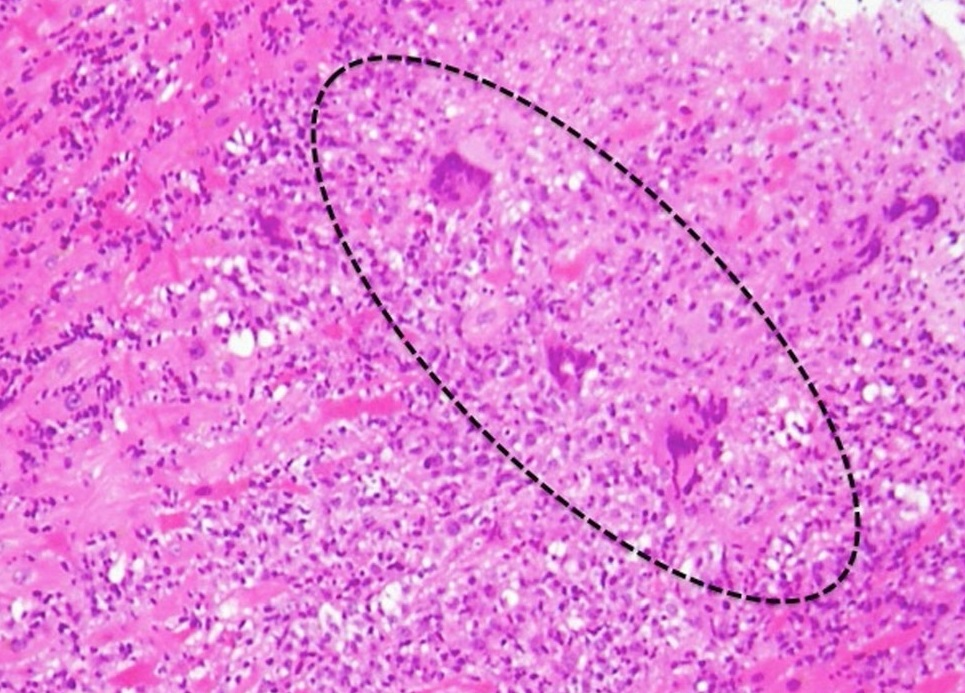
Histopathology of giant-cell myocarditis, with multinucleated giant cells. H&E stain.

Idiopathic giant-cell myocarditis (IGCM) is a cardiovascular disease of the muscle of the heart (myocardium).

The condition is rare; however, it is often fatal and there is no proven cure because of the unknown nature of the disorder.

IGCM frequently leads to death with a high rate of about 70% in first year. A patient with IGCM typically presents with symptoms of heart failure, although some may present initially with ventricular arrhythmia or heart block. Median age from the time the disease is diagnosed to the time of death is approximately 6 months. 90% of patients are either deceased by the end of 1 year or have received a heart transplant. Diagnosis is made by endomyocardial biopsy during heart catheterization. Biopsy shows multinucleated giant cells and thus the name. While previously cases universally required heart transplantation, recent studies show that two-thirds of patients can survive past one year with high doses of immunosuppressants such as prednisone and cyclosporine. The transplanted heart has a high chance of disease recurrence. Compared to lymphocytic (presumed viral) myocarditis, giant cell myocarditis is much more severe with much more rapid progression.

It is suggested to be caused by T-lymphocytes.

== See also ==
- Idiopathic
- Giant cell
- Myocarditis
