= GAPO syndrome =

- Autosomal recessive pattern is the inheritance manner of this condition
- Frequency: < 1 per million

GAPO syndrome is a rare, autosomal recessive disorder that causes severe growth retardation, and has been observed fewer than 30 times before 2011. GAPO is an acronym that encompasses the predominant traits of the disorder: growth retardation, alopecia, pseudoanodontia (teeth failing to emerge from the gums), and worsening optic atrophy in some subjects. Other common symptoms include premature aging, large, prominent foreheads, and delayed bone aging. GAPO syndrome typically results in premature death around age 30–40, due to interstitial fibrosis and atherosclerosis.

== Signs and symptoms ==
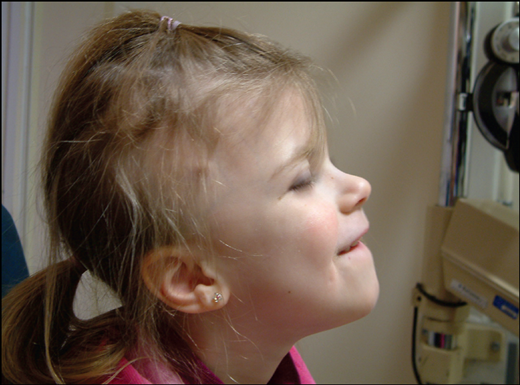
A young girl with thin, fragile hair as is associated with GAPO syndrome

One of the principal symptoms of GAPO syndrome is growth retardation, caused by slow skeletal formation, which results in individuals being below average height. Alopecia, or hair loss, is another key indication of GAPO syndrome. Their hair is typically thinly dispersed, and fragile, which often leads to baldness later in life. Similarly, tooth growth is stunted, with teeth failing to emerge from the gums or otherwise develop normally. Atrophy of the optic nerve occurs in approximately one third of individuals. This degradation leads to inhibited peripheral vision, and increased difficulty distinguishing colours.

While not a defining feature, most individuals with GAPO syndrome have coarse facial features, and abnormal structure of the middle portion of their faces, typically coupled with a large forehead. Individuals with the disease tend to have depressed nose bridges, protruding ears, and abnormally thick lips, though these symptoms are not unique to this disorder.

No direct correlation has been found between GAPO syndrome and intellectual disability, though cases of individuals having both have been reported.

Due to the severity of the phenotype, GAPO syndrome can be diagnosed very early on. Most cases can be diagnosed by 6 months of age, and most symptoms will be apparent by age 2.

== Genetics ==
GAPO syndrome has an autosomal recessive pattern of inheritance.

GAPO syndrome is caused by a deletion in both copies of the ANTXR1 gene, which encodes Anthrax Toxin Receptor 1. This gene is critical for the creation of actin, and its disruption inhibits proper function of the actin network. As a result, individuals with GAPO syndrome have a buildup of extracellular matrix, and degraded cell adhesions. The alteration can occur in the form of nonsense mutations or mutations which alter the splice sites, and result in alternative RNA splicing, leading to synthesis of a different or modified protein. In humans, the ANTXR1 gene is located on Chromosome 2 and has 22 exons.

GAPO syndrome is inherited in an autosomal recessive fashion, and requires both parents to pass on the mutant genotype. Since this mutation is so rare, most confirmed cases have a history of ancestral inbreeding.

== Diagnosis ==
APO syndrome is a very rare genetic disorder characterized by growth retardation, alopecia, pseudoanodontia and progressive optic atrophy (GAPO). To date, only 30 cases have been described worldwide. Recently, gene alterations in the ANTXR1 gene have been reported to be causative of this disorder, and an autosomal recessive pattern has been observed. This gene encodes a matrix-interacting protein that works as an adhesion molecule. In this report, we describe 2 homozygous siblings diagnosed with GAPO syndrome carrying a new missense mutation. This mutation produces the substitution of a glutamine in position 137 for a leucine (c.410A>T, p.Q137L).

== Management ==
There is currently no cure for GAPO syndrome, but some options are available to reduce the symptoms. Nearsightedness, which affects some people with the disease, can be treated by corrective lenses. Unfortunately, optic atrophy as a result of degradation of the optic nerve (common with GAPO syndrome) cannot be corrected. Corticosteroids have been proposed as a treatment for optic nerve atrophy, but their effectiveness is disputed, and no steroid based treatments are currently available.

== History ==
The first incidence of GAPO syndrome was reported by Anderson and Pindborg in 1947. Another case wasn't recorded until 1978 by Fuks et al.
