= Galactorrhea hyperprolactinemia =

- Specialty: Endocrinology

Galactorrhea hyperprolactinemia is increased blood prolactin levels associated with galactorrhea (abnormal milk secretion). It may be caused by such things as certain medications, pituitary disorders and thyroid disorders. The condition can occur in males as well as females. Relatively common etiologies include prolactinoma, medication effect, kidney failure, granulomatous diseases of the pituitary gland, and disorders which interfere with the hypothalamic inhibition of prolactin release. Ectopic (non-pituitary) production of prolactin may also occur. Galactorrhea hyperprolactinemia is listed as a “rare disease” by the Office of Rare Diseases of the National Institutes of Health. This means that it affects less than 200,000 people in the United States population.

== Signs and symptoms ==
Symptoms of galactorrhea hyperprolactinemia include a high blood prolactin level, abnormal milk production in the breast, galactorrhea, menstrual abnormalities, reduced libido, reduced fertility, puberty problems, and headaches.

== Causes ==
The following are some of the possible medical causes of galactorrhea hyperprolactinemia that are listed by the Diseases Database: pregnancy, breastfeeding, sexual intercourse, shingles, prolactin secreting pituitary tumor, along with many others.

== Diagnosis ==
Galactorrhea is generally considered a symptom which may indicate a more serious problem. Collection of a thorough medical history, including pregnancies, surgeries, and consumption of drugs and medications is a first step in diagnosing the cause of galactorrhea. A physical examination, along with a breast examination, will usually be conducted. Blood and urine samples may be taken to determine levels of various hormones in the body, including prolactin and compounds related to thyroid function. A mammogram (an X-ray of the breast) or an ultrasound scan (using high frequency sound waves) might be used to determine if there are any tumors or cysts present in the breasts themselves. If a tumor of the pituitary gland is suspected, a magnetic resonance imaging (MRI) scan can locate tumors or abnormalities in tissues.

== Treatment ==
=== Medical care ===
Direct treatment is geared toward resolving hyperprolactinemic symptoms or reducing tumor size. Patients on medications that cause hyperprolactinaemia should have them withdrawn if possible. Patients with hypothyroidism should be given thyroid hormone replacement therapy. When symptoms are present, medical therapy is the treatment of choice. Patients with hyperprolactinemia and no symptoms (idiopathic or microprolactinoma) can be monitored without treatment. Consider treatment for women with amenorrhea. In addition, dual energy X-ray absorptiometry scanning should be considered to evaluate bone density. The persistent hypogonadism associated with hyperprolactinemia can lead to osteoporosis. Treatment significantly improves the patient's quality of life. If the goal is to treat hypogonadism only, patients with idiopathic hyperprolactinemia or microadenoma can be treated with estrogen replacement therapy and prolactin levels can be monitored. Radiation treatment is another option. However, the risk of hypopituitarism makes this a poor choice. It may be necessary for rapidly growing tumors, but its benefits in routine treatment have not been shown to outweigh the risks.

=== Surgical care ===
General indications for pituitary surgery include patient drug intolerance, tumors resistant to medical therapy, patients who have persistent visual field defects in spite of medical treatment, and patients with large cystic or hemorrhagic tumors.

=== Consultations ===
Physicians who are comfortable with the initial evaluation of a patient (without evidence of tumor mass effect) can easily initiate therapy and provide follow-up. However, given the time constraints of modern ambulatory medicine, consultation with an endocrinologist is often necessary.

== Prognosis ==
The prognosis for patients with prolactinomas is good: most remain stable or regress. In pregnant women, prolactinomas must be observed closely because the lesions may greatly increase in size.

== Epidemiology ==
Hyperprolactinemia occurs more commonly in women. The prevalence of hyperprolactinemia ranges from 0.4% in an unselected normal adult population (10,000 normal Japanese adults working at a single factory) to as high as 9 to 17% in women with reproductive disorders. Its prevalence was found to be 5% in a family planning clinic population, 9% in a population of women with adult-onset amenorrhea, and 17% among women with polyendocrine metabolic ovarian syndrome (PMOS).
