= TRIM55 =

Protein-coding gene in the species Homo sapiens

Identifiers
- Aliases: TRIM55, MURF-2, RNF29, muRF2, tripartite motif containing 55
- External IDs: OMIM: 606469; MGI: 3036269; GeneCards: TRIM55
Enzyme activity
EC #	BRENDA	ExPASy	KEGG	MetaCyc
2.3.2.27	↗	↗	↗	↗

Gene location (Human)
Chr.	Chromosome 8 (human)
Band	8q13.1	Start	66,126,896 bp
Band	8q13.1	End	66,175,485 bp

Gene location (Mouse)
Chr.	Chromosome 3 (mouse)
Band	3|3 A2	Start	19,698,638 bp
Band	3|3 A2	End	19,746,585 bp
RNA expression pattern
Bgee	Human / Mouse (ortholog); Top expressed in: right auricle of heart; myocardium of left ventricle; cardiac muscle tissue of right atrium; apex of heart; muscle of thigh; deltoid muscle; tibialis anterior muscle; right lobe of liver; gastrocnemius muscle; biceps brachii / Top expressed in: heart; skeletal muscle tissue; quadriceps femoris muscle; muscle of thigh; esophagus; embryo; zone of skin; lip; lens; neural tube; More reference expression data
BioGPS	n/a
Gene ontology
Molecular function	zinc ion binding; protein binding; signal transducer activity; metal ion binding; identical protein binding
Cellular component	cytoplasm; microtubule; intracellular anatomical structure; nucleus
Biological process	signal transduction
Sources:Amigo / QuickGO
Orthologs
Databases	NCBI: entry; OMA: entry
Species	Human	Mouse
Entrez	84675	381485
Ensembl	ENSG00000147573	ENSMUSG00000060913
UniProt	Q9BYV6	G3X8Y1
RefSeq (mRNA)	NM_033058; NM_184085; NM_184086; NM_184087	NM_001081281
RefSeq (protein)	NP_149047; NP_908973; NP_908974; NP_908975	NP_001074750
Location (UCSC)	Chr 8: 66.13 – 66.18 Mb	Chr 3: 19.7 – 19.75 Mb
PubMed search
- Wikidata
View/Edit Human	View/Edit Mouse

Tripartite motif-containing protein 55 is a protein that in humans is encoded by the TRIM55 gene.

The protein encoded by this gene contains a RING zinc finger, a motif known to be involved in protein-protein interactions. This protein associates transiently with microtubules, myosin, and titin during muscle sarcomere assembly. It may act as a transient adaptor and plays a regulatory role in the assembly of sarcomeres. Four alternatively spliced transcript variants encoding distinct isoforms have been described.
