= Growth delay-hydrocephaly-lung hypoplasia syndrome =

- Other names: Game-Friedman-Paradice syndrome
- Specialty: Medical genetics
- Symptoms: growth delays and brain-lung abnormalities
- Complications: Incompatibility with life
- Usual onset: neo-natal
- Duration: -
- Causes: Autosomal recessive inheritance
- Prevention: none
- Prognosis: Bad
- Frequency: very rare, only 4 cases have been described in medical literature

Growth delay-hydrocephaly-lung hypoplasia syndrome, also known as Game-Friedman-Paradice syndrome, is a very rare hereditary disorder which is characterized by developmental, lung, and brain anomalies. Only 4 cases have been reported in medical literature.

== Signs and symptoms ==
The following is a list of the symptoms usually shown by fetuses with the disorder:

- Delayed fetal growth
- Hydrocephaly
- Sylvius patent aqueduct
- Micrognathia
- Poorly developed (hypoplastic) lungs
- Malrotated intestines
- Omphalocele
- Shortening of the lower limbs
- Tibia bowing
- Generalized foot abnormalities

== History ==
It was first discovered in 1989, by Game et al. when they described 4 fetus siblings (3 females, 1 male) born to healthy, non-consanguineous parents with all the symptoms mentioned above. The siblings were terminated and all of them (post-mortem examination) had a size similar to fetuses of younger gestational age.
