= GMS syndrome =

- Other names: Goniodysgenesis-intellectual disability-short stature syndrome

GMS syndrome is a syndrome characterised by goniodysgenesis, intellectual disability, and short stature.
