= Phosphorylase =

Class of enzymes

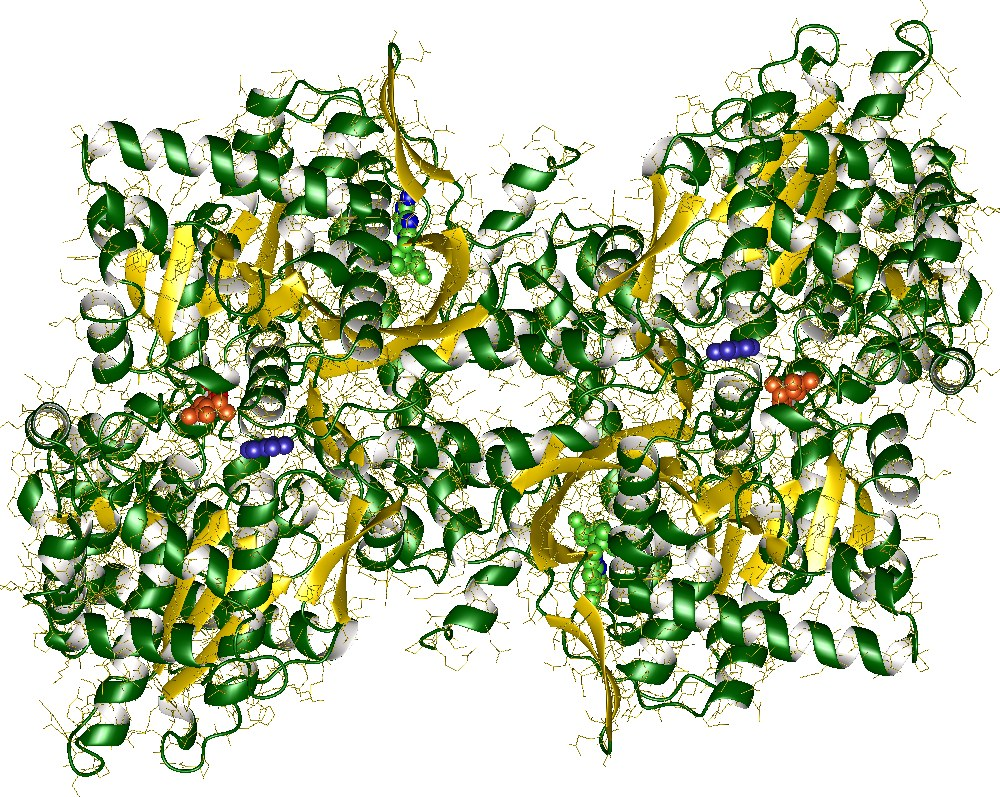

Identifiers
- EC no.: 2.4.1.1
- CAS no.: 9035-74-9

Databases
- BRENDA: enzyme data
- ExPASy: NiceZyme view
- KEGG: enzyme entry
- MetaCyc: metabolic pathway
- Rhea: reactions
- PDB structures: RCSB PDB PDBe PDBsum
Search
- PMC: articles
- PubMed: articles
- NCBI: proteins

In biochemistry, phosphorylases are enzymes that catalyze the addition of a phosphate group from an inorganic phosphate (phosphate+hydrogen) to an acceptor.

A-B + P ⇌ A + P-B

They include allosteric enzymes that catalyze the production of glucose-1-phosphate from a glucan such as glycogen, starch or maltodextrin.

Phosphorylase is also a common name used for glycogen phosphorylase in honor of Earl W. Sutherland Jr., who in the late 1930s discovered it as the first phosphorylase.

== Function ==
Phosphorylases should not be confused with phosphatases, which remove phosphate groups. In more general terms, phosphorylases are enzymes that catalyze the addition of a phosphate group from an inorganic phosphate (phosphate + hydrogen) to an acceptor, not to be confused with a phosphatase (a hydrolase) or a kinase (a phosphotransferase). A phosphatase removes a phosphate group from a donor using water, whereas a kinase transfers a phosphate group from a donor (usually ATP) to an acceptor.

Enzyme name	Enzymes class	Reaction	Notes
Phosphorylase	Transferase (EC 2.4 and EC 2.7.7)	A-B + H-OP ⇌ A-OP + H-B	transfer group = A = glycosyl- group or nucleotidyl- group
Phosphatase	Hydrolase (EC 3)	P-B + H-OH ⇌ P-OH + H-B	
Kinase	Transferase (EC 2.7.1-2.7.4)	P-B + H-A ⇌ P-A + H-B	transfer group = P
P = phosphonate group, OP = phosphate group, H-OP or P-OH = inorganic phosphate

== Types ==
The phosphorylases fall into the following categories:

- Glycosyltransferases (EC 2.4)
  - Enzymes that break down glucans by removing a glucose residue (break O-glycosidic bond)
    - glycogen phosphorylase
    - starch phosphorylase
    - maltodextrin phosphorylase
  - Enzymes that break down nucleosides into their constituent bases and sugars (break N-glycosidic bond)
    - Purine nucleoside phosphorylase (PNPase)
- Nucleotidyltransferases (EC 2.7.7)
  - Enzymes that have phosphorolytic 3' to 5' exoribonuclease activity (break phosphodiester bond)
    - RNase PH
    - Polynucleotide Phosphorylase (PNPase)

All known phosphorylases share catalytic and structural properties.

== Activation ==
Phosphorylase a is the more active R form of glycogen phosphorylase that is derived from the phosphorylation of the less active R form, phosphorylase b with associated AMP. The inactive T form is either phosphorylated by phosphoylase kinase and inhibited by glucose, or dephosphorylated by phosphoprotein phosphatase with inhibition by ATP and/or glucose 6-phosphate. Phosphorylation requires ATP but dephosphorylation releases free inorganic phosphate ions.

== Pathology ==
Some disorders are related to phosphorylases:

- Glycogen storage disease type V - muscle glycogen
- Glycogen storage disease type VI - liver glycogen

== See also ==
- Hydrolase
