= Gastrocutaneous syndrome =

- Other names: Peptic ulcer/hiatal hernia, multiple lentigines/cafe-au-lait spots, hypertelorism, myopia
- Gastrocutaneous syndrome is an autosomal dominant disorder.
- Specialty: Dermatology

Gastrocutaneous syndrome is a rare autosomal dominant cutaneous condition characterized by multiple lentigines.

== See also ==
- Gardner's syndrome
- List of cutaneous conditions
