= Glycogen storage disease type VI =

- Other names: Glycogen storage disease due to liver glycogen phosphorylase deficiency
- Glycogen
- Specialty: Endocrinology

Glycogen storage disease type VI (GSD VI) is a type of glycogen storage disease caused by a deficiency in liver glycogen phosphorylase or other components of the associated phosphorylase cascade system. It is also known as "Hers' disease", after Henri G. Hers, who characterized it in 1959. The scope of GSD VI now also includes glycogen storage disease type VIII, IX (caused by phosphorylase b kinase deficiency) and X (deficiency protein kinase A).

The incidence of GSD VI is approximately 1 case per 65,000–85,000 births, representing approximately 30% all cases of glycogen storage disease.

== Signs and symptoms ==
Patients generally have a benign course, and typically present with hepatomegaly and growth retardation early in childhood. Mild hypoglycemia, hyperlipidemia, and hyperketosis may occur. Lactic acid and uric acid levels may be normal. However, lactic acidosis may occur during fasting.

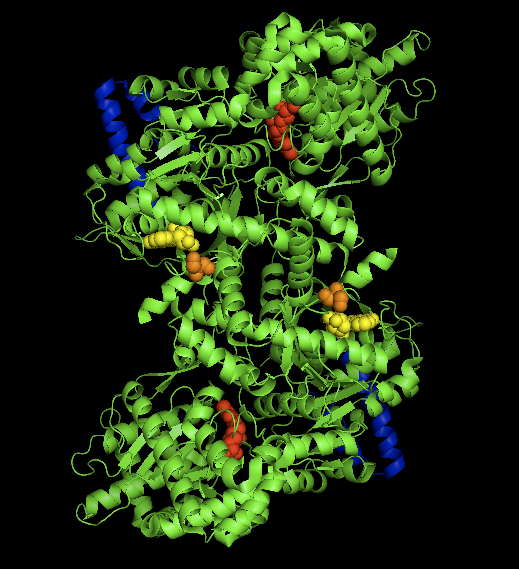
GlycogenPhosphorylase

== Treatment ==
Because symptoms of GSD6 are generally mild, the disorder usually requires no treatment other than to avoid prolonged periods without eating. Because glycogen is only broken down when stored energy needs to be used, eating frequent meals can prevent the need to break down glycogen. Levels of blood glucose should be monitored to make sure that the diet is working correctly. This will minimize the symptoms of the disease.

== See also ==
- Phosphorylase kinase
