= Phosphorolysis =

Type of chemical reaction

Phosphorolysis is the cleavage of a compound in which inorganic phosphate is the attacking group. It is analogous to hydrolysis.

An example of this is glycogen breakdown by glycogen phosphorylase, which catalyzes attack by inorganic phosphate on the terminal glycosyl residue at the nonreducing end of a glycogen molecule. If the glycogen chain has n glucose units, the products of a single phosphorolytic event are one molecule of glucose 1-phosphate and a glycogen chain of n-1 remaining glucose units.

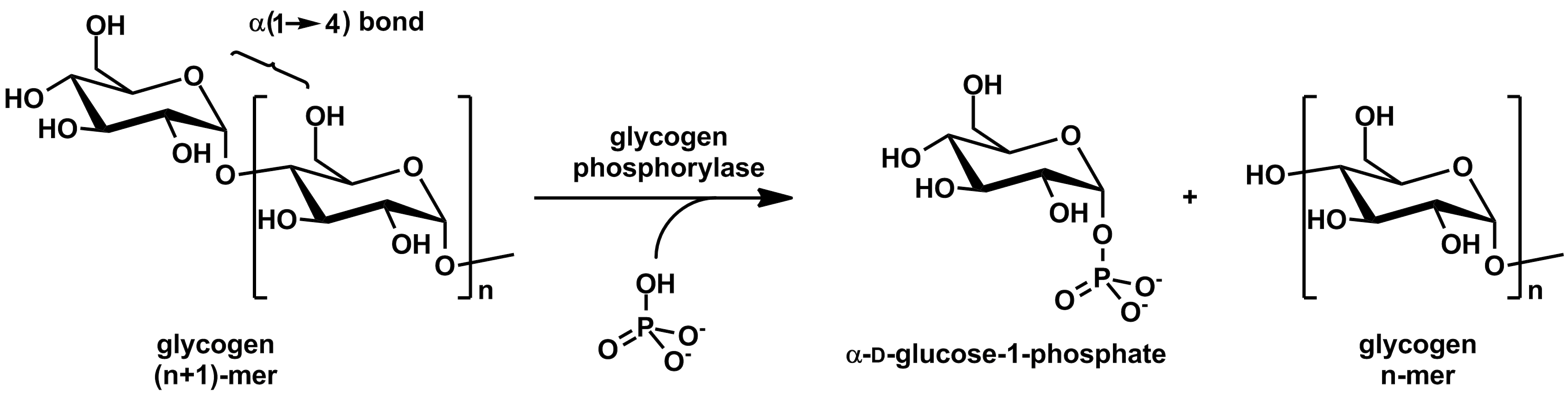
Action of Glycogen Phosphorylase on Glycogen

In addition, sometimes phosphorolysis is preferable to hydrolysis (like in the breakdown of glycogen or starch, as in the example above) because glucose 1-phosphate yields more ATP than does free glucose when subsequently catabolized to pyruvate.

Another example of phosphorolysis is seen in the conversion of glyceraldehyde 3-phosphate to 1,3-bisphosphoglycerate in glycolysis. The mechanism involves phosphorolysis.

== See also ==
- Phosphorylase
