= Glucose 1-phosphate =

- Anionic form of α-D-glucose 1-phosphate

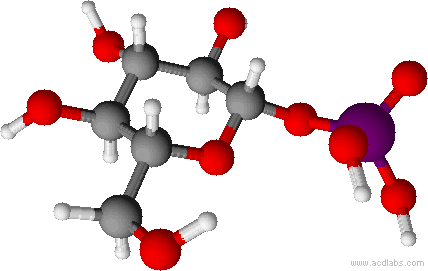
- Neutral form of α-D-glucose 1-phosphate

Names
- IUPAC name D-Glucopyranosyl dihydrogen phosphate
- Systematic IUPAC name (2Ξ,3R,4S,5S,6R)-3,4,5-Trihydroxy-6-(hydroxymethyl)oxan-2-yl dihydrogen phosphate
- Other names Cori ester

Identifiers
CAS Number	59-56-3
3D model (JSmol)	Interactive image
ChEBI	CHEBI:16077
ChemSpider	388311
ECHA InfoCard	100.000.396
KEGG	C00103
MeSH	glucose-1-phosphate
PubChem CID	65533
UNII	CIX3U01VAU
CompTox Dashboard (EPA)	DTXSID90889321
- InChI: InChI=1S/C6H13O9P/c7-1-2-3(8)4(9)5(10)6(14-2)15-16(11,12)13/h2-10H,1H2,(H2,11,12,13)/t2-,3-,4+,5-,6?/m1/s1 Key: HXXFSFRBOHSIMQ-GASJEMHNSA-N; InChI=1/C6H13O9P/c7-1-2-3(8)4(9)5(10)6(14-2)15-16(11,12)13/h2-10H,1H2,(H2,11,12,13)/t2-,3-,4+,5-,6?/m1/s1 Key: HXXFSFRBOHSIMQ-GASJEMHNBR
- SMILES: O=P(O)(OC1O[C@@H]([C@@H](O)[C@H](O)[C@H]1O)CO)O

Properties
Chemical formula	C_{6}H_{13}O_{9}P
Molar mass	260.135 g·mol^{−1}
- Except where otherwise noted, data are given for materials in their standard state (at 25 °C [77 °F], 100 kPa). verify (what is ?) Infobox references

Glucose 1-phosphate (also called Cori ester) is a glucose molecule with a phosphate group on the 1'-carbon. It can exist in either the α- or β-anomeric form.

== Reactions of α-glucose 1-phosphate ==
=== Catabolic ===
In glycogenolysis, it is the direct product of the reaction in which glycogen phosphorylase cleaves off a molecule of glucose from a greater glycogen structure. A deficiency of muscle glycogen phosphorylase is known as glycogen storage disease type V (McArdle Disease).

To be utilized in cellular catabolism it must first be converted to glucose 6-phosphate by the enzyme phosphoglucomutase in a free equilibrium. One reason that cells form glucose 1-phosphate instead of glucose during glycogen breakdown is that the very polar phosphorylated glucose cannot leave the cell membrane and so is marked for intracellular catabolism. Phosphoglucomutase-1 deficiency is known as glycogen storage disease type 14 (GSD XIV).

=== Anabolic ===
In glycogenesis, free glucose 1-phosphate can also react with UTP to form UDP-glucose, by using the enzyme UDP-glucose pyrophosphorylase. It can then return to the greater glycogen structure via glycogen synthase.

== β-Glucose 1-phosphate ==
β-Glucose 1-phosphate is found in some microbes. It is produced by inverting α-glucan phosphorylases including maltose phosphorylase, kojibiose phosphorylase and trehalose phosphorylase and is then converted into glucose 6-phosphate by β-phosphoglucomutase.

== See also ==
- Pentose phosphate pathway
- Gerty Cori
