= McArdle =

McArdle or MacArdle is an Irish surname. It originates in County Monaghan, where it was the fifth most common surname in 1970. The surname in Irish is MacArdghail, from ardghal, meaning 'high valour' or from the Irish "ardghail" meaning "tall foreigner" with roots "ard" meaning "tall" and "gail" meaning "foreigner", indicative of their original ancestor being a Viking or from Viking stock. The surname is also common in County Armagh and County Louth.

They are a branch of the McMahon clans of Oriel, descendants from 'Ardghail Mor MacMahon' (Irish name: Ardghail MacBriain MacMathghamhna), who was chief of the MacMahons and King of Oriel from 1402 to 1416. They were based originally in the barony of Monaghan and a branch became sub-chiefs in County Armagh under the O'Neills of the Fews.

== People with the surname ==
- Aidan McArdle, Irish actor
- Aoife McArdle, Irish writer, director, and cinematographer
- Andrea McArdle (born 1963), Irish-American singer and actress
- Angela McArdle (born 1983), American Libertarian politician
- Anne McArdle, British physiologist
- Brendan McArdle (born 1952), Australian cricketer
- Brian McArdle (1911–2002), British doctor
- J. Brian De Largie McArdle (1920–1969), Australian photojournalist, editor of Walkabout magazine
- Charlotte McArdle, Chief Nursing Officer for Northern Ireland
- Donald Macardle (1900–1984), Irish actor and writer
- Dorothy Macardle (1889–1958), Irish author and historian
- Fiachra McArdle (born 1983), Irish footballer for Kildare F.C
- George McArdle, Australian bass guitarist
- Harry McArdle, British scientist
- Henry Arthur McArdle (1836–1908), American painter
- Jack McArdle, British designer
- James McArdle (born 1989), Scottish actor
- John McArdle (born 1949), English actor
- John J. McArdle (1951–2022), American psychologist
- Joseph A. McArdle (1903–1967), American politician
- Kenndal McArdle (born 1987), Canadian ice hockey player
- L. D. McArdle (1857–1938), American politician
- Mark McArdle (1956–2025), Australian politician
- Mary McArdle, Irish biographer and revolutionary
- Matthew McArdle (born 1971), Australian rower
- Megan McArdle (born 1973), American blogger and journalist
- Nick McArdle, Australian sportscaster
- Pete McArdle (1929–1985), Irish-American long-distance runner
- Peter McArdle (born 1965), English artist
- Peter McArdle (footballer) (1914–1979), English footballer
- Peter J. McArdle (1874–1940), Pittsburgh City Council member
- Richard E. McArdle (1899–1983), Chief of United States Forest Service
- Rory McArdle (born 1987), football player for Northern Ireland and Rochdale A.F.C.
- Sean McArdle (disambiguation), multiple people
- Stanley McArdle (1922–2007), British Rear Admiral in the Royal Navy
- Tom McArdle, American film editor
- William McArdle (1848–1908), American politician

== See also ==
- McArdle Laboratory
- McArdle's disease, a metabolic disease more often known as glycogen storage disease type V
- Macardle Moore Brewery
- McCardle
- James MacArdell
