= Hitting the wall =

Sudden fatigue during endurance sports

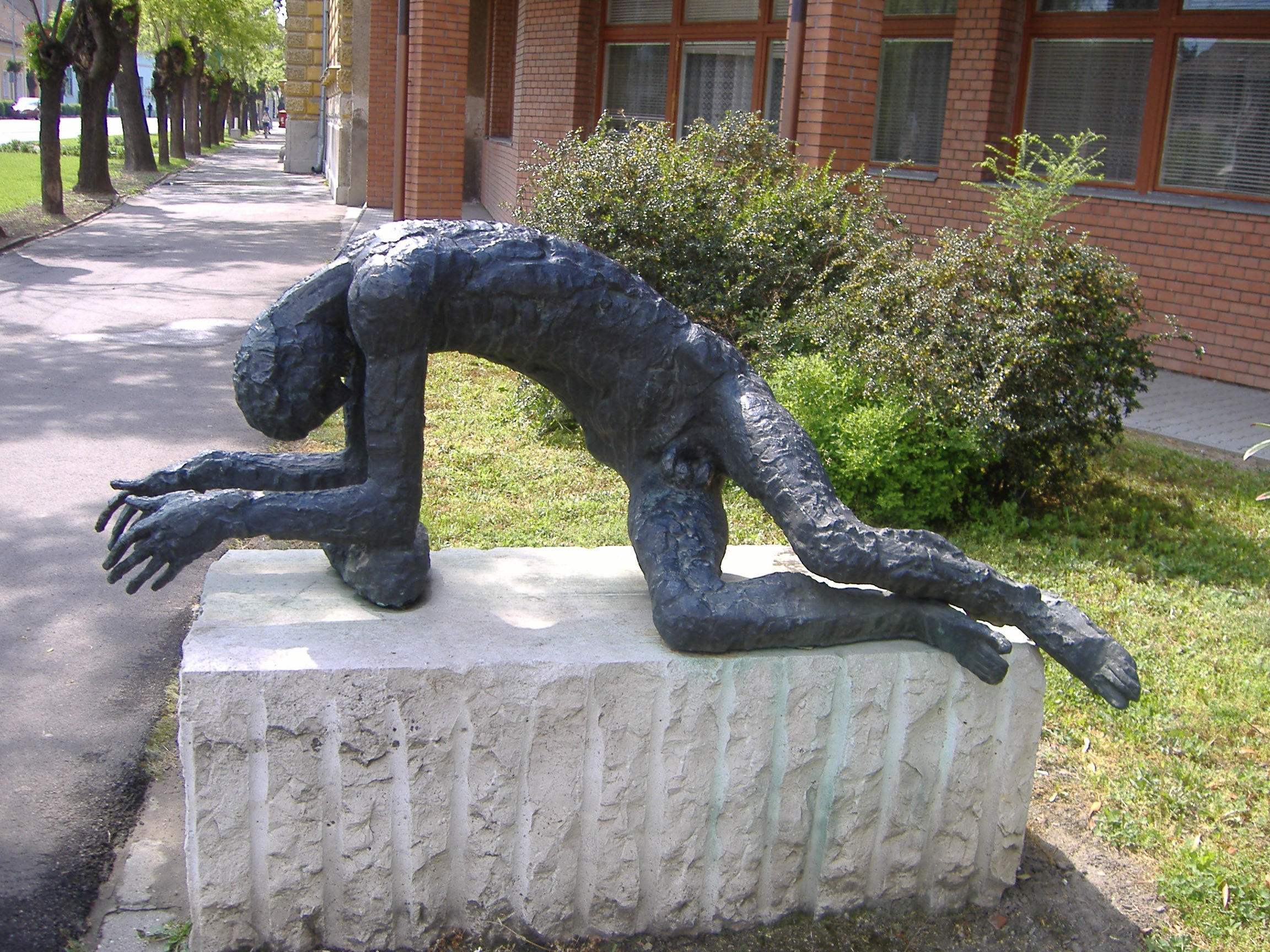
Statue of the "Tired Man" (Megfáradt ember in Hungarian), referring to the poem of Attila József. The statue is the work of József Somogyi.

In endurance sports such as road cycling and long-distance running, hitting the wall or the bonk is a condition of sudden fatigue and loss of energy which is caused by the depletion of glycogen stores in the liver and muscles. Milder instances can be remedied by brief rest and the ingestion of food or drinks containing carbohydrates. Otherwise, it can be remedied by attaining second wind by either resting for approximately 10 minutes or by slowing down considerably and increasing speed slowly over a period of 10 minutes. Ten minutes is approximately the time that it takes for free fatty acids to sufficiently produce ATP in response to increased demand.

During a marathon, for instance, runners typically hit the wall around kilometer 30 (mile 20). The condition can usually be avoided by ensuring that glycogen levels are high when the exercise begins, maintaining glucose levels during exercise by eating or drinking carbohydrate-rich substances, or by reducing exercise intensity.

== Biology ==
Skeletal muscle relies predominantly on glycogenolysis for the first few minutes as it transitions from rest to activity, as well as throughout high-intensity aerobic activity and all anaerobic activity. The lack of glycogen causes a low ATP reservoir within the exercising muscle cells. Until second wind is achieved (increased ATP production primarily from free fatty acids), the symptoms of a low ATP reservoir in exercising muscle due to depleted glycogen include: muscle fatigue, muscle cramping, muscle pain (myalgia), inappropriate rapid heart rate response to exercise (tachycardia), breathlessness (dyspnea) or rapid breathing (tachypnea), exaggerated cardiorespiratory response to exercise (tachycardia & dyspnea/tachypnea). The heart tries to compensate for the energy shortage by increasing heart rate to maximize delivery of oxygen and blood borne fuels to the muscle cells for oxidative phosphorylation.

Without muscle glycogen, it is important to get into second wind without going too fast, too soon nor trying to push through the pain. Going too fast, too soon encourages protein metabolism over fat metabolism, and the muscle pain in this circumstance is a result of muscle damage due to a severely low ATP reservoir.

Protein metabolism occurs through amino acid degradation which converts amino acids into pyruvate, the breakdown of protein to maintain the amino acid pool, the myokinase (adenylate kinase) reaction and purine nucleotide cycle. Amino acids are vital to the purine nucleotide cycle as they are precursors for purines, nucleotides, and nucleosides; as well as branch-chained amino acids are converted into glutamate and aspartate for use in the cycle (see Aspartate and glutamate synthesis). Severe breakdown of muscle leads to rhabdomyolysis and myoglobinuria. Excessive use of the myokinase reaction and purine nucleotide cycle leads to myogenic hyperuricemia.

In muscle glycogenoses (muscle GSDs), an inborn error of carbohydrate metabolism impairs either the formation or utilization of muscle glycogen. As such, those with muscle glycogenoses do not need to do prolonged exercise to experience hitting the wall. Instead, signs of exercise intolerance, such as an inappropriate rapid heart rate response to exercise, are experienced from the beginning of activity.

== Etymology, usage, and synonyms ==
The term bonk for fatigue is presumably derived from the original meaning "to hit", and dates back at least half a century. Its earliest citation in the Oxford English Dictionary is a 1952 article in the Daily Mail.

The term is used colloquially as a noun ("hitting the bonk") and as a verb ("to bonk halfway through the race"). The condition is also known to long-distance (marathon) runners, who usually refer to it as "hitting the wall". The British may refer to it as "hunger knock," while "hunger bonk" was used by South African cyclists in the 1960s.

It can also be referred to as "blowing up" or a "weak attack".

=== In other languages ===
In German, hitting the wall is known as "der Mann mit dem Hammer" ("the man with the hammer"); the phenomenon is thus likened to a man with the hammer coming after the athlete, catching up, and eventually hitting the athlete, causing a sudden drop in performance.

In French, marathoners in particular use "frapper le mur (du marathon)", literally hitting the (marathon) wall. One may also hear "avoir un coup de barre" (getting smacked by a bar), which means experiencing sudden, incredible fatigue. This expression is used in a wider set of contexts.

== Mechanisms ==
Athletes engaged in exercise over a long period of time produce energy via two mechanisms, both facilitated by oxygen:

- via fat metabolism and
- via breakdown of glycogen into glucose-1-phosphate, followed by glycolysis.

How much energy comes from either source depends on the intensity of the exercise. During intense exercise that approaches one's VO_{2} max, most of the energy comes from glycogen.

A typical untrained individual on an average diet is able to store about 380 grams of glycogen, or 1500 kcal, in the body, though much of that amount is spread throughout the muscular system and may not be available for any specific type of exercise. Intense cycling or running can easily consume 600–800 or more kcal per hour. Unless glycogen stores are replenished during exercise, glycogen stores in such an individual will be depleted after less than 2 hours of continuous cycling or 15 miles (24 km) of running. Training and carbohydrate loading can raise these reserves as high as 880 g (3600 kcal), correspondingly raising the potential for uninterrupted exercise.

== Effects ==
In one study of five male subjects, "reduction in preexercise muscle glycogen from 59.1 to 17.1 μmol × g^{−1} (n = 3) was associated with a 14% reduction in maximum power output but no change in maximum O_{2} intake; at any given power output O_{2} intake, heart rate, and ventilation (VE) were significantly higher, CO_{2} output (V_{CO_{2}}) was similar, and the respiratory exchange ratio was lower during glycogen depletion compared with control." Five is an extremely small sample size, so this study may not be representative of the general population.

== Avoidance ==
There are several approaches to prevent glycogen depletion:

- Carbohydrate loading is used to ensure that the initial glycogen levels are maximized, thus prolonging the exercise. This technique amounts to increasing complex carbohydrate intake during the last few days before the event.
- Consuming food or drinks containing carbohydrates during the exercise. This is an absolute must for very long distances; it is estimated that Tour de France competitors receive up to 50% of their daily caloric intake from on-the-bike supplements.
- Lowering the intensity of the exercise to the so-called 'fat max' level (aerobic threshold or "AeT") will lower the fraction of the energy that comes from glycogen as well as the amount of energy burned per unit of time.

== See also ==
- Exercise intolerance
- Second wind (exercise phenomenon)
- McArdle Disease (GSD-V)
- Metabolic myopathy
