= Second wind =

Exercise phenomenon

Second wind is a phenomenon in endurance sports, such as marathons or road running, whereby an athlete who is out of breath and too tired to continue (known as "hitting the wall") finds the strength to press on at top performance with less exertion. The feeling may be similar to that of a "runner's high", the most obvious difference being that the runner's high occurs after the race is over.

In experienced athletes, "hitting the wall" is conventionally believed to be due to the body's glycogen stores being depleted, with "second wind" occurring when fatty acids become the predominant source of energy. The delay between "hitting the wall" and "second wind" occurring has to do with the slow speed at which fatty acids sufficiently produce ATP (energy), with fatty acids taking approximately 10 minutes, whereas muscle glycogen is considerably faster at about 30 seconds. Some scientists believe the second wind to be a result of the body finding the proper balance of oxygen to counteract the buildup of lactic acid in the muscles. Others claim second winds are due to endorphin production.

Heavy breathing during exercise also provides cooling for the body. After some time the veins and capillaries dilate and cooling takes place more through the skin, so less heavy breathing is needed. The increase in the temperature of the skin can be felt at the same time as the "second wind" takes place.

Documented experiences of the second wind go back at least 100 years, when it was taken to be a commonly held fact of exercise. The phenomenon has come to be used as a metaphor for continuing on with renewed energy past the point thought to be one's prime, whether in other sports, careers, or life in general.

== Hypotheses ==
=== Metabolic switching ===
When non-aerobic glycogen metabolism is insufficient to meet energy demands, physiologic mechanisms utilize alternative sources of energy such as fatty acids and proteins via aerobic respiration. Second-wind phenomena in metabolic disorders such as McArdle's disease are attributed to this metabolic switch and the same or a similar phenomenon may occur in healthy individuals (see symptoms of McArdle's disease).

=== Lactic acid ===
Muscular exercise as well as other cellular functions requires oxygen to produce ATP and properly function. This normal function is called aerobic metabolism and does not produce lactic acid if enough oxygen is present. During heavy exercise such as long distance running or any demanding exercise, the body's need for oxygen to produce energy is higher than the oxygen supplied in the blood from respiration. Anaerobic metabolism to some degree then takes place in the muscle and this less ideal energy production produces lactic acid as a waste metabolite. If the oxygen supply is not soon restored, this may lead to accumulation of lactic acid.

This is the case even without exercise in people with respiratory disease, challenged circulation of blood to parts of the body or any other situation when oxygen cannot be supplied to the tissues involved.

Some people's bodies may take more time than others to be able to balance the amount of oxygen they need to counteract the lactic acid. This theory of the second wind posits that, by pushing past the point of pain and exhaustion, runners may give their systems enough time to warm up and begin to use the oxygen to its fullest potential. For this reason, well-conditioned Olympic-level runners do not generally experience a second wind (or they experience it much sooner) because their bodies are trained to perform properly from the start of the race.

=== Endorphins ===
Endorphins are credited as the cause of the feeling of euphoria and wellbeing found in many forms of exercise, so proponents of this theory believe that the second wind is caused by their early release. Many of these proponents feel that the second wind is very closely related to—or even interchangeable with—the runner's high.

== Pathology ==
In muscle glycogen storage diseases (muscle GSDs), an inborn error of carbohydrate metabolism impairs either the formation or utilization of muscle glycogen. As such, those with muscle glycogenoses do not need to do prolonged exercise to experience "hitting the wall". Instead, signs of exercise intolerance, such as an inappropriate rapid heart rate response to exercise, are experienced from the beginning of an activity, and some muscle GSDs can achieve second wind within about 10 minutes from the beginning of the aerobic activity, such as walking.

A second wind phenomenon is also seen in some medical conditions, such as McArdle disease (GSD-V) and Phosphoglucomutase deficiency (PGM1-CDG/CDG1T/GSD-XIV). Unlike non-affected individuals that have to do long-distance running to deplete their muscle glycogen, in GSD-V individuals their muscle glycogen is unavailable, so second wind is achieved after 6–10 minutes of light to moderate aerobic activity (such as walking without an incline).

Skeletal muscle relies predominantly on glycogenolysis for the first few minutes as it transitions from rest to activity, as well as throughout high-intensity aerobic activity and all anaerobic activity. In GSD-V, due to a glycolytic block, there is an energy shortage in the muscle cells after the phosphagen system has been depleted. The heart tries to compensate for the energy shortage by increasing heart rate to maximize delivery of oxygen and blood borne fuels to the muscle cells for oxidative phosphorylation. Exercise intolerance such as muscle fatigue and pain, an inappropriate rapid heart rate in response to exercise (tachycardia), heavy (hyperpnea) and rapid breathing (tachypnea) are experienced until sufficient energy is produced via oxidative phosphorylation, primarily from free fatty acids.

Oxidative phosphorylation by free fatty acids is more easily achievable for light to moderate aerobic activity (below the aerobic threshold), as high-intensity (fast-paced) aerobic activity relies more on muscle glycogen due to its high ATP consumption. Oxidative phosphorylation by free fatty acids is not achievable with isometric and other anaerobic activity (such as lifting weights), as contracted muscles restrict blood flow (leaving oxygen and blood borne fuels unable to be delivered to muscle cells adequately for oxidative phosphorylation).

The second wind phenomenon in GSD-V individuals can be demonstrated by measuring heart rate during a 12 Minute Walk Test. A "third wind" phenomenon is also seen in GSD-V individuals, where after approximately 2 hours, they see a further improvement of symptoms as the body becomes even more fat adapted.

Without muscle glycogen, it is important to get into second wind without going too fast, too soon nor trying to push through the pain. Going too fast, too soon encourages protein metabolism over fat metabolism, and the muscle pain in this circumstance is a result of muscle damage due to a severely low ATP reservoir. Aiming for ATP production primarily from fat metabolism rather than protein metabolism is also why the preferred method for getting into second wind is to slowly increase speed during aerobic activity for 10 minutes, rather than to go quickly from the outset and then resting for 10 minutes before resuming. In muscle glycogenoses, second wind is achieved gradually over 6–10 minutes from the beginning of aerobic activity and individuals may struggle to get into second wind within that timeframe if they accelerate their speed too soon or if they try to push through the pain. Understanding the types of activity with which second wind can be achieved and which external factors affect it (such as walking into a headwind, walking on sand, or an icy surface), with practice while paying attention to the sensations in their muscles and using a heart rate monitor to see if their heart rate shoots up too high, individuals can learn how to get into second wind safely to the point where it becomes almost second nature (much like riding a bicycle or driving).

Pain killers and muscle relaxants dull the sensations in the muscles that let us know if we are going too fast, so either take them after exercise or be extra mindful about the speed if you have to take them during exercise. Otherwise, individuals might find themselves in a spiral of taking painkillers or muscle relaxants, inadvertently causing muscle damage because they can't feel the early warning signals that their muscles are giving them, then having to take more because of the increased pain from muscle damage, then causing even more muscle damage while exercising on the increased dosage, which then causes more pain, and so on. Due to the glycolytic block, those with McArdle disease and select other muscle glycogenoses don't produce enough lactic acid to feel the usual kind of pain that unaffected individuals do during exercise, so the phrase "no pain, no gain" should be ignored; muscle pain and tightness should be recognized as signals to slow down or rest briefly.

Going too fast, too soon encourages protein metabolism over fat metabolism. Protein metabolism occurs through amino acid degradation which converts amino acids into pyruvate, the breakdown of protein to maintain the amino acid pool, the myokinase (adenylate kinase) reaction and purine nucleotide cycle. Amino acids are vital to the purine nucleotide cycle as they are precursors for purines, nucleotides, and nucleosides; as well as branch-chained amino acids are converted into glutamate and aspartate for use in the cycle (see Aspartate and glutamate synthesis). Severe breakdown of muscle leads to rhabdomyolysis and myoglobinuria. Excessive use of the myokinase reaction and purine nucleotide cycle leads to myogenic hyperuricemia.

For McArdle disease (GSD-V), regular aerobic exercise utilizing "second wind" to enable the muscles to become aerobically conditioned, as well as anaerobic exercise (strength training) that follows the activity adaptations so as not to cause muscle injury, helps to improve exercise intolerance symptoms and maintain overall health. Studies have shown that regular low-moderate aerobic exercise increases peak power output, increases peak oxygen uptake (VO_{2}_{peak}), lowers heart rate, and lowers serum CK in individuals with McArdle disease.

Regardless of whether the patient experiences symptoms of muscle pain, muscle fatigue, or cramping, the phenomenon of second wind having been achieved is demonstrable by the sign of an increased heart rate dropping while maintaining the same speed on the treadmill. Inactive patients experienced second wind, demonstrated through relief of typical symptoms and the sign of an increased heart rate dropping, while performing low-moderate aerobic exercise (walking or brisk walking).

Conversely, patients that were regularly active did not experience the typical symptoms during low-moderate aerobic exercise (walking or brisk walking), but still demonstrated second wind by the sign of an increased heart rate dropping. For the regularly active patients, it took more strenuous exercise (very brisk walking/jogging or bicycling) for them to experience both the typical symptoms and relief thereof, along with the sign of an increased heart rate dropping, demonstrating second wind.

In young children (<10 years old) with McArdle disease (GSD-V), it may be more difficult to detect the second wind phenomenon. They may show a normal heart rate, with normal or above normal peak cardio-respiratory capacity (VO_{2max}). That said, patients with McArdle disease typically experience symptoms of exercise intolerance before the age of 10 years, with the median symptomatic age of 3 years.

Tarui disease (GSD-VII) patients do not experience the "second wind" phenomenon; instead are said to be "out-of-wind". However, they can achieve sub-maximal benefit from lipid metabolism of free fatty acids during aerobic activity following a warm-up.

== See also ==
- "Hitting the wall"
- McArdle disease (GSD-V)
- Phosphoglucomutase deficiency (PGM1-CDG/CDG1T/GSD-XIV)
- Metabolic myopathies
- Glycogen storage disease
- Inborn errors of carbohydrate metabolism
- Tachycardia § sinus (inappropriate rapid heart rate response to exercise)
- IST § differential diagnosis (inappropriate sinus tachycardia)
