= Sinus tachycardia =

Higher than typical heart rate

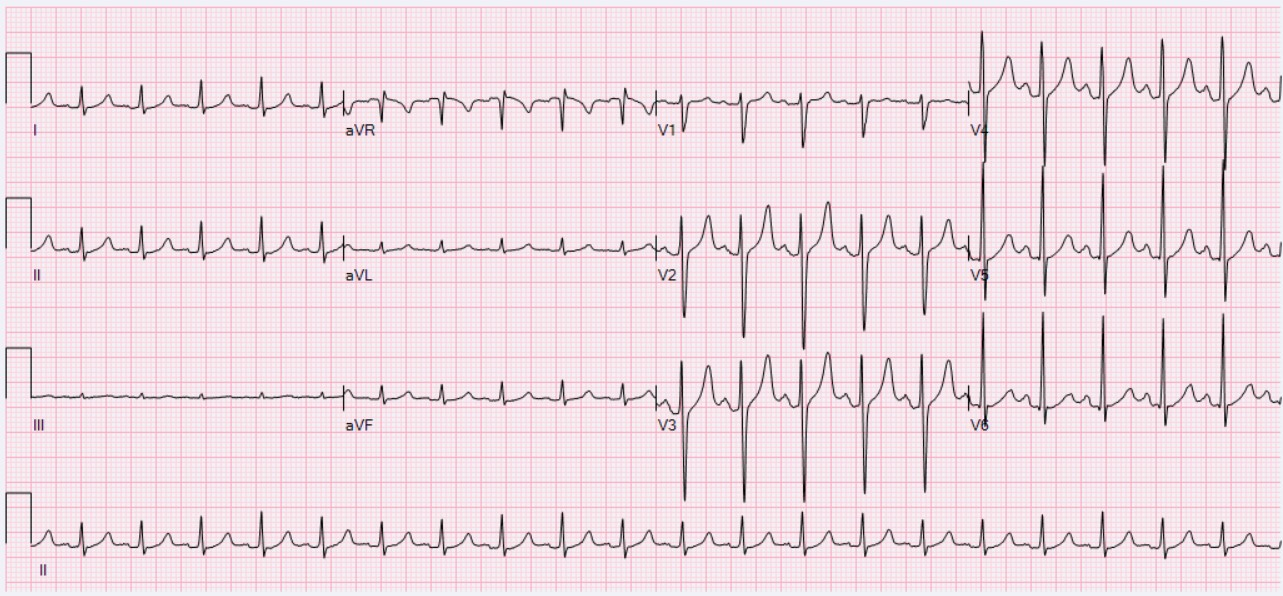
- ECG of a 29-year-old female with sinus tachycardia with a heart rate of 125 bpm
- Specialty: Cardiology

Sinus tachycardia is a sinus rhythm of the heart, with an increased rate of electrical discharge from the sinoatrial node, resulting in a tachycardia, a heart rate that is higher than the upper limit of normal (90–100 beats per minute for adult humans).

The normal resting heart rate is 60–90 bpm in an average adult. Normal heart rates vary with age and level of fitness, with infants having faster heart rates (110-150 bpm) and the elderly having slower heart rates. Sinus tachycardia is a normal response to physical exercise or other stress, when the heart rate increases to meet the body's higher demand for energy and oxygen, but sinus tachycardia can also be caused by a health problem.

An elite athlete's heart recorded during a maximum effort workout maintaining over 180 bpm for 10 minutes.

== Signs and symptoms ==
Tachycardia is often asymptomatic. It is often a resulting symptom of a primary disease state and can be an indication of the severity of a disease. If the heart rate is too high, cardiac output may fall due to the markedly reduced ventricular filling time. Rapid rates, though they may be compensating for ischemia elsewhere, increase myocardial oxygen demand and reduce coronary blood flow, thus precipitating an ischemic heart or valvular disease. Sinus tachycardia accompanying a myocardial infarction may be indicative of cardiogenic shock.

== Cause ==
Sinus tachycardia is usually a response to physiological stress, such as exercise, or an increased sympathetic tone with increased catecholamine release, such as stress, fright, flight, and anger. Other causes include:

- Pain
- Fever
- Anxiety
- Dehydration
- Excess cortisol
- Malignant hyperthermia
- Hypovolemia with hypotension and shock
- Anemia
- Hyperthyroidism
- Mercury poisoning
- Kawasaki disease
- Pheochromocytoma
- Sepsis
- Pulmonary embolism
- Acute coronary ischemia and myocardial infarction
- Chronic obstructive pulmonary disease
- Hypoxia
- Intake of stimulants such as caffeine, theophylline, nicotine, cocaine, or amphetamines
- Hyperdynamic circulation
- Electric shock
- Drug withdrawal
- Porphyria
- Acute inflammatory demyelinating polyradiculoneuropathy
- Postural orthostatic tachycardia syndrome
- Mitral valve prolapse
- Metabolic myopathies

== Diagnosis ==
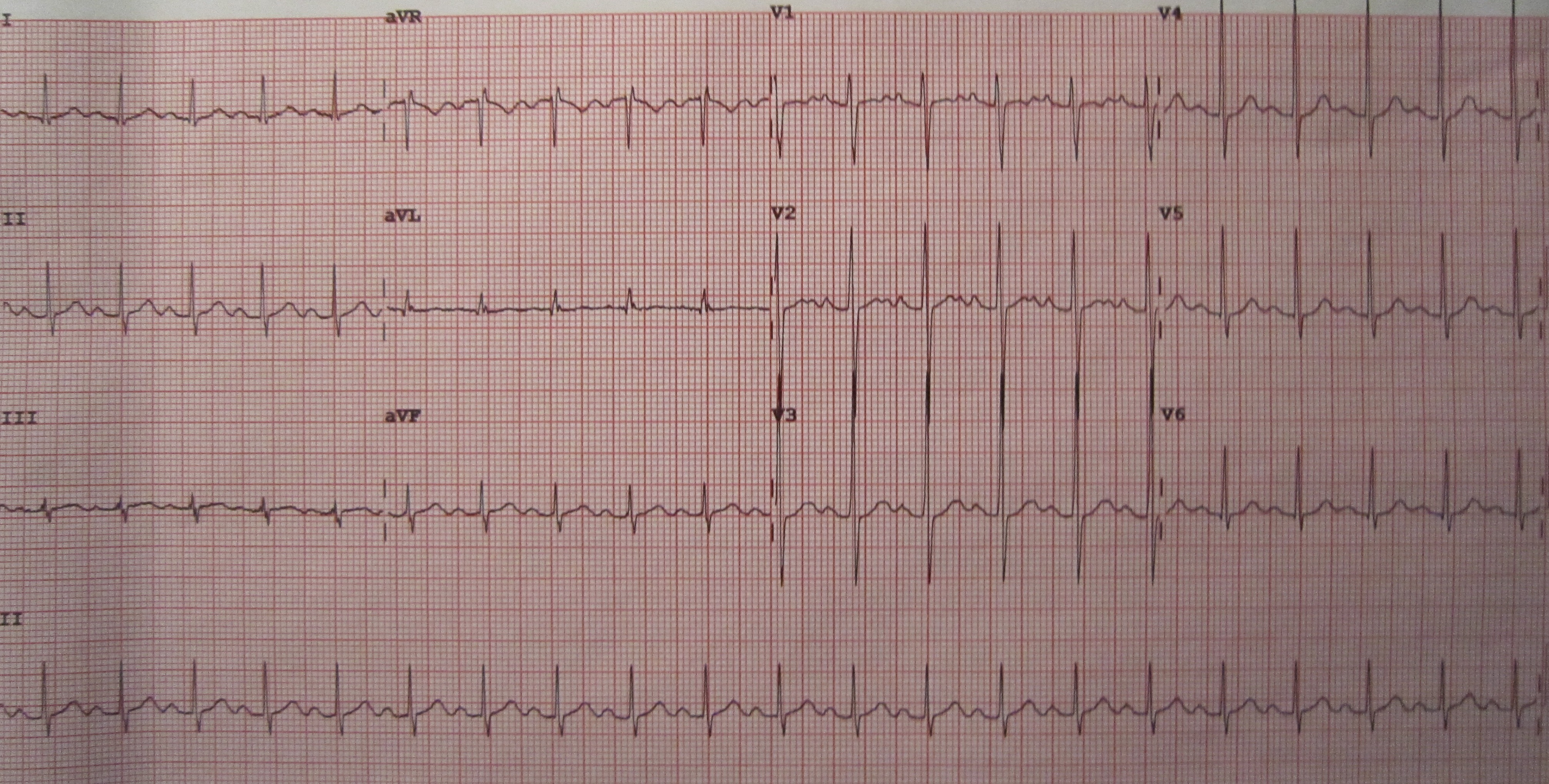
A 12 lead ECG showing sinus tachycardia

Sinus tachycardia is usually apparent on an ECG, but if the heart rate is above 140 bpm the P wave may be difficult to distinguish from the previous T wave and one may confuse it with a paroxysmal supraventricular tachycardia or atrial flutter with a 2:1 block. Ways to distinguish the three are:

- Vagal maneuvers (such as carotid sinus massage or Valsalva's maneuver) to slow the rate and identification of P waves
- administer AV blockers (e.g., adenosine, verapamil) to identify atrial flutter with 2:1 block

Heart sounds should also be listened to.

=== ECG characteristics ===
- Rate: Greater than or equal to 100.
- Rhythm: Regular.
- P waves: Upright, in leads I, II and aVL, and negative in lead aVR;
- each P wave is followed by a QRS and T waves

=== Inappropriate sinus tachycardia ===
In inappropriate sinus tachycardia (also known as chronic nonparoxysmal sinus tachycardia), patients have an elevated resting heart rate and/or exaggerated heart rate in response to exercise. These patients have no apparent heart disease or other causes of sinus tachycardia. IST is thought to be due to abnormal autonomic control. IST is a diagnosis of exclusion.

=== Postural orthostatic tachycardia syndrome ===
Usually, in women with no heart problems, this syndrome is characterized by normal resting heart rate but exaggerated postural sinus tachycardia with or without orthostatic hypotension.

=== Metabolic myopathy ===
Upon exertion, sinus tachycardia can be seen in some inborn errors of metabolism that result in metabolic myopathies, such as McArdle Disease (GSD-V) and Hereditary myopathy with lactic acidosis (Larsson–Linderholm syndrome). Metabolic myopathies interfere with the muscle's ability to create energy. This energy shortage in muscle cells causes an inappropriate rapid heart rate response to exercise. The heart tries to compensate for the energy shortage by increasing heart rate to maximize delivery of oxygen and other blood borne fuels to the muscle cells.

In one such category of metabolic myopathies, muscle glycogenoses (muscle GSDs), individuals are unable to create energy from muscle glycogen, and depending on the muscle GSD, may not be able to utilize blood glucose within the muscle cell either. As skeletal muscle relies predominantly on glycogenolysis for the first few minutes as it transitions from rest to activity, as well as throughout high-intensity aerobic activity and all anaerobic activity, individuals with glycogenoses experience during exercise: sinus tachycardia, tachypnea, muscle fatigue and pain, during the aforementioned activities and time frames. Notable in McArdle Disease (GSD-V) is the phenomenon of second wind where after approximately 6–10 minutes of aerobic exercise, such as walking without an incline, the heart rate drops as blood borne fuels, predominantly from free fatty acids, produce energy via oxidative phosphorylation.

Rare diseases, such as McArdle disease, are often misdiagnosed. The inappropriate rapid heart rate response to exercise may be misdiagnosed as inappropriate sinus tachycardia (which is a diagnosis of exclusion).

== Treatment ==
Treatment for physiologic sinus tachycardia involves treating the underlying causes of the tachycardia response. Beta blockers may be used to decrease tachycardia in patients with certain conditions, such as ischemic heart disease and rate-related angina. In patients with inappropriate sinus tachycardia, careful titration of beta-blockers, salt loading, and hydration typically reduce symptoms. Patients who are unresponsive to such treatment can undergo catheter ablation to potentially repair the sinus node.

=== Acute myocardial infarction (AMI) ===
Sinus tachycardia can present in more than a third of the patients with AMI but this usually decreases over time. Patients with sustained sinus tachycardia reflects a larger infarct that are more anterior with prominent left ventricular dysfunction, associated with high mortality and morbidity. Tachycardia in the presence of AMI can reduce coronary blood flow and increase myocardial oxygen demand, aggravating the situation. Beta-blockers can be used to slow the rate, but most patients are usually already treated with beta-blockers as a routine regimen for AMI.

=== IST and POTS ===
Beta blockers are useful if the cause is sympathetic overactivity. If the cause is due to decreased vagal activity, it is usually hard to treat and one may consider radiofrequency catheter ablation.

== See also ==
- Acute myocardial infarction (AMI)
- Inappropriate sinus tachycardia (IST)
- Metabolic myopathy
- Postural orthostatic tachycardia syndrome (PoTS)
- Second wind (exercise phenomenon)
