= Essential dermatitis =

- Specialty: Dermatology

Essential dermatitis is an idiopathic inflammation of the skin that does not fit the picture of other well defined conditions (such as atopic or contact dermatitis) and is a diagnosis of exclusion.

== See also ==
- Dermatitis
- List of cutaneous conditions
