= Glycogen storage disease type V =

Human disease caused by deficiency of a muscle enzyme

- Other names: McArdle disease; muscle glycogen phosphorylase (myophosphorylase) deficiency
- Muscle biopsy specimen showing vacuolar myopathy: The patient had a type V glycogenosis (McArdle disease)
- Specialty: Neuromuscular medicine
- Symptoms: Exercise intolerance, inappropriate rapid heart rate response to exercise, exaggerated cardiorespiratory response to exercise, exercise-induced premature muscle fatigue and cramping, second wind phenomenon
- Complications: Poor physical or mental health due to prolonged delay in diagnosis, misdiagnosis, or having been given inappropriate exercise advice. Rare complications include rhabdomyolysis with myoglobinuria requiring hospitalization, transient muscle contracture, and compartment syndrome.
- Usual onset: Childhood-onset (median age of symptom onset 3 years)
- Causes: Pathogenic autosomal recessive mutations in PYGM gene coding for myophosphorylase
- Diagnostic method: Genetic testing (preferred), muscle biopsy. Supplemental tests: blood tests, exercise stress test, 12-minute Walk Test, non-ischemic forearm test, EMG

Glycogen storage disease type V (GSD5, GSD-V), also known as McArdle's disease, is a metabolic disorder, one of the metabolic myopathies, more specifically a muscle glycogen storage disease, caused by a deficiency of myophosphorylase. Its incidence is reported as one in 100,000, roughly the same as glycogen storage disease type I.

The disease was first reported in 1951 by British physician Brian McArdle of Guy's Hospital, London.

== Signs and symptoms ==
=== Onset of symptoms and diagnostic delay ===
In the classic phenotype, the onset of this disease is usually noticed in childhood, but often not diagnosed until the third or fourth decade of life, frequently due to misdiagnosis and dismissal of symptoms. The median age of symptom onset is 3 years, with the median diagnostic delay being 29 years. Misdiagnosis is overwhelmingly common, with approximately 90% of patients being misdiagnosed, and approximately 62% receiving multiple misdiagnoses before a correct diagnosis. The prolonged diagnostic delay, misdiagnosis or multiple misdiagnoses, or being given inappropriate exercise advice (such as ignore pain or avoid exercise) severely impacts the quality of life (QoL), physically and mentally.

=== Ultra-rare phenotypes ===
==== Late adult-onset, limb–girdle phenotype ====
There is an ultra-rare adult-onset, limb–girdle phenotype that presents very late in life (70+ years of age) due to a recessive homozygous PYGM mutation (p. Lys42Profs*48) resulting in severe upper and lower limb atrophy, with the possibility of ptosis (drooping eyelids) and camptocormia (stooped posture). As of 2017, there have been two reported cases of this specific homozygous mutation and phenotype. In 1980, a woman also had a limb–girdle phenotype with onset at age 60, histochemical staining showed myophosphorylase deficiency; however the genetic mutation was unknown.

==== Fatal infantile-onset phenotype ====
There is an ultra-rare, fatal infantile-onset phenotype that results in profound muscle weakness ("floppy baby") and respiratory failure within weeks of birth (perinatal asphyxia). Post-mortem biopsy showed a deficiency of myophosphorylase and abnormal glycogen accumulation in skeletal muscle tissue. This phenotype may also include premature birth and joint contractures. Two reported cases, in 1978 and 1989.

==== Mild phenotype ====
There is an ultra-rare mild phenotype caused by recessive heterozygous alleles in the PYGM gene, where one allele is a common exon mutation and the other allele is an ultra-rare intronic mutation. It can also be caused by recessive homozygous intronic mutations. These intronic mutations result in a milder phenotype compared to the classic phenotype of McArdle disease. There is residual myophosphorylase activity, between 1-2% residual activity compared to unaffected individuals. This results in greater exercise capacity compared to classic phenotype McArdle individuals, particularly for sustained aerobic activity, but the capacity was still below that of unaffected individuals. In this mild phenotype, since their early teens, they did experience cramping and premature muscle fatigue during sudden vigorous exercise and prolonged isometric exercise; however, due to their less diminished capacity for aerobic activity, they were able to keep up with their peers in sports and everyday activities. As of 2009, there have been 3 reported cases of non-related individuals, a reported Druze family of consanguineous (related) individuals and 9 reported cases in two Finnish families.

=== Common signs and symptoms ===
The most prominent symptom is that of exercise intolerance which includes:

- premature muscle fatigue (particularly for anaerobic activity and high-intensity aerobic activity, which may be described as inability to keep up with peers or reduced stamina);
- exercise-induced painful cramps;
- inappropriate rapid heart rate response to exercise;
- exaggerated cardiorespiratory response to exercise (heavy or rapid breathing with inappropriately rapid heart rate);
- second wind phenomenon (muscle fatigue and heart rate improve for aerobic activity after approximately 6–10 minutes).

Heart rate during exercise is a key indicator as, unlike the symptoms of muscle fatigue and cramping, it is a medical sign (meaning that it is observable and measurable by a third party rather than felt subjectively by the patient). In regularly active individuals with McArdle disease, they may not feel the usual symptoms of muscle fatigue and cramping until they increase their speed to very brisk walking, jogging, or cycling; however, they will still show an inappropriately rapid heart rate response to exercise, with a declining heart rate once second wind has been achieved.

"In McArdle's, our heart rate tends to increase in what is called an 'inappropriate' response. That is, after the start of exercise it increases much more quickly than would be expected in someone unaffected by McArdle's."

=== Other symptoms and comorbidities ===
Myoglobinuria (reddish-brown urine) may be seen due to the breakdown of skeletal muscle known as rhabdomyolysis (a condition in which muscle cells breakdown, sending their contents into the bloodstream). In 2020, the largest study to-date of 269 GSD-V patients, 39.4% reported no previous episodes of myoglobinuria and 6.8% had normal CK (including those with fixed muscle weakness); so an absence of myoglobinuria and normal CK should not rule out the possibility of the disease. Between 33-51.4% develop fixed muscle weakness, typically of the trunk and upper body, with the onset of muscle weakness usually occurring later in life (40+ years of age).

Younger people may display unusual symptoms, such as difficulty chewing, swallowing, or utilizing normal oral motor functions. Idiopathic leg pains were common in children, usually occurring at night, often presumed to be "growing pains" and not investigated further. Several comorbidities were found in GSD-V individuals at a higher rate than in the general population, including (but not limited to): hypertension (17%), endocrine diseases (15.7%), musculoskeletal/rheumatic disease (12.9%), hyperuricemia/gout (11.6%), gastrointestinal diseases (11.2%), neurological disease (10%), respiratory disease (9.5%), and coronary artery disease (8.3%). They may have a pseudoathletic appearance of muscle hypertrophy (24%), particularly of the legs, and may have lower bone mineral content and density in the legs.

Besides exercise-induced premature muscle fatigue, GSD-V individuals may also have comorbidities of mental fatigue, general fatigue, reduced motivation, sleep disturbances, anxiety, and depression.

As skeletal muscle relies predominantly on glycogenolysis for the first few minutes as it transitions from rest to activity, as well as throughout high-intensity aerobic activity and all anaerobic activity, individuals with GSD-V experience during exercise: sinus tachycardia, tachypnea, muscle fatigue and pain, during the aforementioned activities and time frames. They may exhibit a "second wind" phenomenon, which is characterized by the individual's better tolerance for aerobic exercise such as walking and cycling after approximately 10 minutes. This is attributed to the combination of increased blood flow and the ability of the body to find alternative sources of energy, like fatty acids, proteins, and increased blood glucose uptake.

AMP is primarily produced from the myokinase (adenylate kinase) reaction, which runs when the ATP reservoir is low. The myokinase reaction is one of three reactions in the phosphagen system (ATP-PCr), with the myokinase reaction occurring after phosphocreatine (creatine phosphate) has been depleted. In McArdle disease individuals, their muscle cells produce far more AMP than non-affected individuals as the reduced glycolytic flux from impaired glycogenolysis results in a chronically low ATP reservoir during exercise. The muscle cells need ATP (adenosine triphosphate) as it provides energy for muscle contraction by actively transporting calcium ions into the sarcoplasmic reticulum before muscle contraction, and it is used during muscle contraction for the release of myosin heads in the sliding filament model during the cross-bridge cycle.

Along with the myokinase reaction, AMP is also produced by the purine nucleotide cycle, which also runs when the ATP reservoir in muscle cells is low, and is a part of protein metabolism. In the purine nucleotide cycle, three nucleotides: AMP (adenosine monophosphate), IMP (inosine monophosphate), and S-AMP (adenylosuccinate) are converted in a circular fashion; the byproducts are fumarate (which goes on to produce ATP via oxidative phosphorylation), ammonia (from the conversion of AMP into IMP), and uric acid (from excess AMP). GSD-V patients may experience myogenic hyperuricemia (exercise-induced accelerated breakdown of purine nucleotides in skeletal muscle).

To avoid health complications, GSD-V patients need to get their ATP primarily from free fatty acids (lipid metabolism) rather than protein metabolism. Over-reliance on protein metabolism can be best avoided by not depleting their ATP reservoir, such as by not pushing through the pain and by not going too fast, or too soon.

Patients may present at emergency rooms with a transient contracture of the muscles and often severe pain (e.g. "clawed hand"). These require urgent assessment for rhabdomyolysis as in about 30% of cases this leads to acute kidney injury, which left untreated can be life-threatening. In a small number of cases compartment syndrome has developed, requiring prompt surgical referral.

== Genetics ==
Autosomal recessive inheritance

McArdle disease (GSD-V) is inherited in an autosomal recessive manner. If both parents are carriers (not having the disease, but each parent having one copy of the mutated allele), then each child of the couple will have a 25% chance of being affected (having McArdle disease), a 50% chance of being a carrier, and a 25% chance of being unaffected (neither a carrier nor diseased).

Two autosomal recessive forms of this disease occur, childhood-onset and adult-onset. The gene for myophosphorylase, PYGM (the muscle-type of the glycogen phosphorylase gene), is located on chromosome 11q13. According to the most recent publications, 95 different mutations have been reported. The forms of the mutations may vary between ethnic groups. For example, the R50X (Arg50Stop) mutation (previously referred to as R49X) is most common in North America and Western Europe, and the Y84X mutation is most common among central Europeans.

The exact method of protein disruption has been elucidated in certain mutations. For example, R138W is known to disrupt to pyridoxal phosphate binding site. In 2006, another mutation (c.13_14delCT) was discovered which may contribute to increased symptoms in addition to the common Arg50Stop mutation.

=== Myophosphorylase ===
==== Structure ====
The myophosphorylase structure consists of 842 amino acids. The molecular weight of the unprocessed precursor is 97 kDa. The three-dimensional structure has been determined for this protein. The interactions of several amino acids in myophosphorylase's structure are known. Ser-14 is modified by phosphorylase kinase during activation of the enzyme. Lys-680 is involved in binding the pyridoxal phosphate, which is the active form of vitamin B_{6}, a cofactor required by myophosphorylase. By similarity, other sites have been estimated: Tyr-76 binds AMP, Cys-109 and Cys-143 are involved in subunit association, and Tyr-156 may be involved in allosteric control.

==== Function ====
Myophosphorylase is the form of the glycogen phosphorylase found in muscle that catalyses the following reaction:

((1→4)-alpha-D-glucosyl) _{(n)} + phosphate = ((1→4)-alpha-D-glucosyl) _{(n-1)} + alpha-D-glucose 1-phosphate

During exercise, a deficiency of this enzyme ultimately leads to rapid depletion of phosphocreatine, a decrease in available ATP, and an exaggerated rise of ADP and AMP. McArdle disease individuals also have increased maximum fat oxidation compared to unaffected individuals. During exercise, in affected individuals, there is no significant rise in lactic acid production compared to resting levels (it may even fall below resting levels), and plasma pH levels rise (become more alkaline) rather than fall (become more acidic).

== Pathophysiology ==
Myophosphorylase is involved in the breakdown of glycogen to glucose-1-phosphate for use in muscle. The enzyme removes 1,4 glycosyl residues from the outer branches of glycogen and adds inorganic phosphate to form glucose-1-phosphate. Ordinarily, the removal of 1,4 glycosyl residues by myophosphorylase leads to the formation of glucose-1-phosphate during glycogen breakdown and the polar, phosphorylated glucose cannot leave the cell membrane and so is marked for intracellular catabolism. In McArdle's disease, deficiency of myophosphorylase leads to the accumulation of intramuscular glycogen and a lack of glucose-1-phosphate for cellular fuel.

Myophosphorylase comes in two forms: form 'a' is phosphorylated by phosphorylase kinase, form 'b' is not phosphorylated. Form 'a' is de-phosphorylated into form 'b' by the enzyme phosphoprotein phosphatase, which is activated by elevated insulin. Both forms have two conformational states: active (R or relaxed) and inactive (T or tense). When either form 'a' or 'b' is in the active state, then the enzyme converts glycogen into glucose-1-phosphate. Myophosphorylase-b is allosterically activated by elevated AMP within the cell, and allosterically inactivated by elevated ATP and/or glucose-6-phosphate. Myophosphorylase-a is active unless allosterically inactivated by elevated glucose within the cell. In this way, myophosphorylase-a is the more active of the two forms as it will continue to convert glycogen into glucose-1-phosphate even with high levels of glycogen-6-phosphate and ATP.

== Diagnosis ==
There are some laboratory tests that may aid in the diagnosis of GSD-V. A muscle biopsy will note the absence of myophosphorylase in muscle fibers. In some cases, abnormal glycogen accumulation stained by periodic acid-Schiff can be seen with microscopy.

Genetic sequencing of the PYGM gene (which codes for the muscle isoform of glycogen phosphorylase) may be done to determine the presence of gene mutations, determining if McArdle's is present. This type of testing is considerably less invasive than a muscle biopsy.

The physician can also perform an ischemic forearm exercise test as described below (see History). Some findings suggest a nonischemic test could be performed with similar results. The nonischemic version of this test would involve not cutting off the blood flow to the exercising arm. Findings consistent with McArdle's disease would include a failure of lactate to rise in venous blood and exaggerated ammonia levels. These findings would indicate a severe muscle glycolytic block.

Serum lactate may fail to rise in part because of increased uptake via the monocarboxylate transporter (MCT1), which is upregulated in skeletal muscle in McArdle disease. Lactate may be used as a fuel source once converted to pyruvate. Ammonia levels may rise given ammonia is a by-product of AMP deaminase which follows after the production of AMP by adenylate kinase, an alternative pathway for ATP production. In this pathway, adenylate kinase combines two ADP molecules to make ATP and AMP; AMP is then deaminated, producing inosine monophosphate (IMP) and ammonia (NH_{3}) as part of purine nucleotide cycle.

Physicians may also check resting levels of creatine kinase, which are moderately increased in 90% of patients. In some, the level is increased by multitudes - a person without GSD-V will have a CK between 60 and 400IU/L, while a person with the syndrome may have a level of 5,000 IU/L at rest, and may increase to 35,000 IU/L or more with muscle exertion. This can help distinguish McArdle's syndrome from carnitine palmitoyltransferase II deficiency (CPT-II), a lipid-based metabolic disorder that prevents fatty acids from being transported into mitochondria for use as an energy source. Also, serum electrolytes and endocrine studies (such as thyroid function, parathyroid function, and growth hormone levels) will also be completed. Urine studies are required only if rhabdomyolysis is suspected. Urine volume, urine sediment, and myoglobin levels would be ascertained. If rhabdomyolysis is suspected, serum myoglobin, creatine kinase, lactate dehydrogenase, electrolytes, and renal function will be checked.

Physicians may also conduct an exercise stress test to test for an inappropriately rapid heart rate (sinus tachycardia) in response to exercise. Due to the rare nature of the disease, the inappropriate rapid heart rate in response to exercise may be misdiagnosed as inappropriate sinus tachycardia (which is a diagnosis of exclusion). The 12 Minute Walk Test (12MWT) can be used to determine "second wind," which requires a treadmill (no incline), heart rate monitor, stopwatch, pain scale, and that the patient has rested for 30 minutes before the test to ensure that "second wind" has stopped (that is, that increased ATP production primarily from free fatty acids has returned to resting levels).

Electromyography (EMG) may show normal or myopathic results (short duration, polyphasic, small amplitude MUAPs). Before exercise, a minority of GSD-V patients show myopathic results (5/25 patients); whereas after 5 minutes of high-intensity isometric exercise, the majority showed myopathic results (22/25 patients). The myopathic results were a decrease in CMAP amplitude, which was evident immediately after exercise and, after a plateau phase of a few minutes, reached its maximum after 30 minutes.

=== Differential diagnosis ===
Dynamic symptoms of exercise intolerance (e.g. muscle fatigue and cramping) with or without fixed proximal muscle weakness:

- Another glycogen storage disease that affects muscle (muscle GSD);
- Metabolic myopathy other than glycogen storage disease;
- Endocrine myopathy that affects carbohydrate metabolism secondary to the primary disease;
- Inadequate blood flow (ischemia), particularly of the calves
  - Intermittent claudication;
  - Popliteal artery entrapment syndrome;
  - Chronic venous insufficiency.
- Poor diet or malabsorption disease resulting in malnutrition of micronutrients essential for muscle glycogen metabolism;
- Other rare myopathies, such as Brody disease, Rippling muscle disease, Erythrocyte lactate transporter defect, a small number of muscular dystrophies, Tubular aggregate myopathy (TAM), etc.

Exercise-induced muscle fatigue without cramping:

- Myasthenia gravis;
- Lambert–Eaton myasthenic syndrome;
- Congenital myasthenic syndromes.

Fixed symptoms of muscle weakness, predominantly of the proximal muscles:

- Limb-girdle muscular dystrophy;
- Inflammatory myopathy.

Allelic to McArdle disease (GSD-V) is a disease that has a pathogenic autosomal dominant mutation in exon 16 of the PYGM gene c.1915G>C (p.Asp639His). Discovered in 2020, it affected 13 members of a family over four generations and has yet to be assigned a GSD number. Unlike McArdle disease (GSD-V), this disease does not have an overall deficiency of myophosphorylase, only a deficiency of functioning myophosphorylase-a with plenty of functioning myophosphorylase-b (similar to GSD-IXd). Myophosphorylase-b can be allosterically activated to break down glycogen (glycogenolysis) by high levels of AMP, and as the AMP-dependent activity was preserved, the individuals of this family had normal muscle glycogen concentrations as well as lacked exercise intolerance (which are prominent distinguishing features from McArdle disease). The only symptom was adult-onset (40+ years of age) fixed muscle weakness, initially of the proximal muscles of the legs, followed by proximal arms, then distal leg muscles. Muscle biopsy also showed accumulation of the intermediate filament desmin in the myofibres.

== Treatment ==
Supervised exercise programs have been shown in small studies to improve exercise capacity by several measures: lowering heart rate, lowering serum creatine kinase (CK), increasing the exercise intensity threshold before symptoms of muscle fatigue and cramping are experienced, and the skeletal muscles becoming aerobically conditioned.

Oral sucrose treatment (for example a sports drink with 75 grams of sucrose in 660 ml.) taken 30 minutes before exercise has been shown to help improve exercise tolerance, including a lower heart rate and lower perceived level of exertion compared with placebo. This is because the ingestion of a high-carbohydrate meal or drink causes transient hyperglycaemia, with the exercising muscle cells utilizing the high glucose in the blood for the glycolytic pathway. However, the ingestion of a high-carbohydrate meal or drink is problematic as a frequent form of treatment since it will increase the release of insulin, which inhibits the release of fatty acids and subsequently will delay the ability to get into second wind. The frequent ingestion of sucrose (e.g. sugary drinks), to avoid premature muscle fatigue and cramping, is also problematic in that it can lead to obesity as insulin will also stimulate triglyceride synthesis (develop body fat), and obesity-related ill health (e.g. type II diabetes and heart disease).

A low dosage treatment with creatine showed a significant improvement of muscle problems compared to placebo in a small clinical study, while other studies have shown minimal subjective benefit. High-dosage treatment of creatine has been shown to worsen symptoms of myalgia (muscle pain).

A ketogenic diet has demonstrated beneficial for McArdle disease (GSD-V) as ketones readily convert to acetyl CoA for oxidative phosphorylation, whereas free fatty acids take a few minutes to convert into acetyl CoA. Ketones are a part of fat metabolism, the ketones can act as the main fuel before fatty acid catabolism takes over (second wind), during which the ketones would act as a supplementary fuel alongside the fatty acids to produce adenosine triphosphate (ATP) by oxidative phosphorylation.

== History ==
The deficiency was the first metabolic myopathy to be recognized when the physician Brian McArdle described the first case in a 30-year-old man who always experienced pain and weakness after exercise. McArdle noticed this patient's cramps were electrically silent and his venous lactate levels failed to increase upon ischemic exercise. (The ischemic exercise consists of the patient squeezing a hand dynamometer at maximal strength for a specific period, usually a minute, with a blood pressure cuff, which is placed on the upper arm and set at 250 mmHg, blocking blood flow to the exercising arm.)

Notably, this is the same phenomenon that occurs when muscle is poisoned in vitro by iodoacetate, which inhibits the breakdown of glycogen into glucose and prevents the formation of lactate; as well as produces an electronically silent muscle contracture. Knowing what occurs to muscle poisoned by iodoacetate, helped McArdle speculate that a glycogenolytic block might be occurring when he first described the disease. McArdle accurately concluded that the patient had a disorder of glycogen breakdown that specifically affected skeletal muscle. The associated enzyme deficiency was discovered in 1959 by W. F. H. M. Mommaerts et al.

== In animals ==
Naturally occurring myophosphorylase deficiency (GSD-V; McArdle disease) has been found in Charolais cattle and Merino sheep. The cattle were asymptomatic at rest, but when forced to exercise, would become noticeably fatigued and recumbent (having to lie down) for approximately 10 minutes before being able to resume exercise (the second wind phenomenon).

Artificially-induced myophosphorylase deficiency was created in mice, by altering their embryonic DNA, for use in laboratory experiments.

== See also ==
- Glycogen storage disease
- Hitting the wall (muscle fatigue due to glycogen depletion)
- Inborn errors of carbohydrate metabolism
- Purine nucleotide cycle§Glycogenoses (GSDs)
- Second wind (increased ATP production primarily by fatty acids after glycogen depletion)
