= McCardle =

McCardle is a surname. Notable people with the surname include:

- Carl McCardle (1904–1972), American journalist and public official, Assistant Secretary of State for Public Affairs (1953–1957)
- Eliza McCardle Johnson (1810–1876), wife of President Andrew Johnson
- Fred McCardle (born 1951), Canadian politician, member of the Legislative Assembly of Prince Edward Island (2003–2007)
- Peter McCardle (born 1955), New Zealand politician
- William H. McCardle (1815–1893), American writer and editor
- William Wilson McCardle (1844–1922), member of the New Zealand Legislative Council

== See also ==
- Ex parte McCardle, United States Supreme Court case
- McArdle
