= Inappropriate sinus tachycardia =

Syndrome where the sinus heart rate is inexplicably faster than expected

- Other names: IST
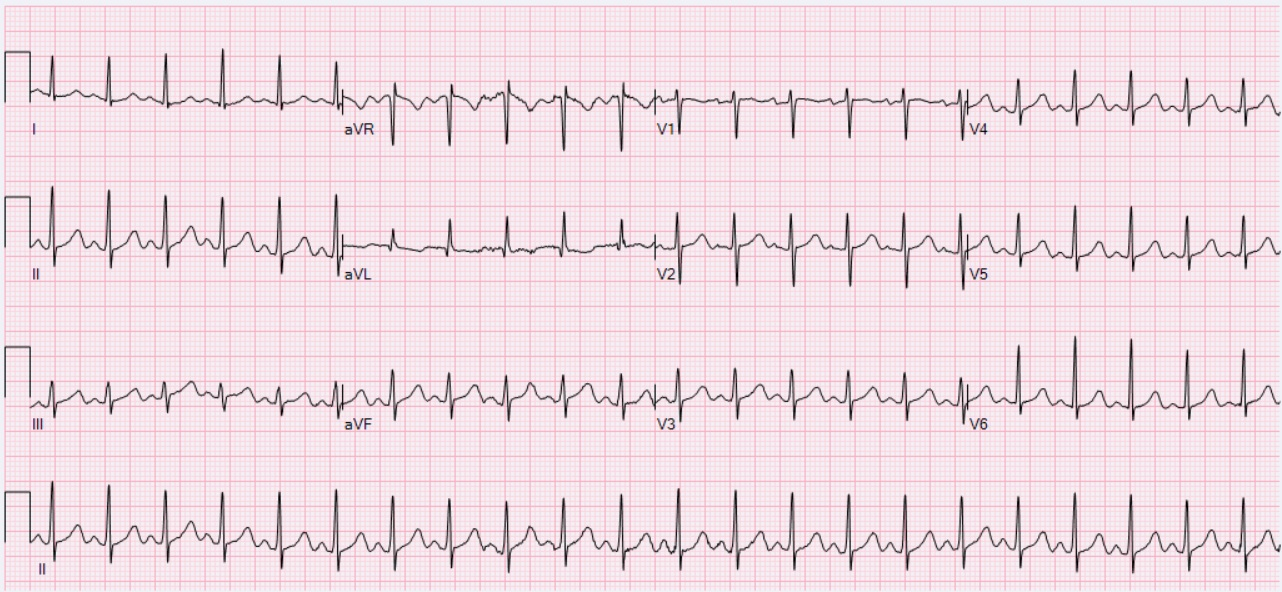
- ECG of 33-year-old female showing sinus tachycardia at 132 bpm
- Specialty: Cardiology
- Symptoms: Palpitations, Chest pain, Fatigue, shortness of breath, Lightheadedness, and syncope.
- Causes: Increased sympathetic or decreased parasympathetic drive, increased intrinsic heart rate, dysfunctional neurohormonal modulation, ectopic sinus node activity, and beta-adrenergic receptor autoantibodies.
- Diagnostic method: Persistent or recurrent sinus tachycardia on a 12-lead electrogram or long-term monitoring that is not explained by other means
- Differential diagnosis: Metabolic myopathies, Postural orthostatic tachycardia syndrome, Sinus node reentry, and Vasovagal syncope.
- Treatment: Medications, lifestyle modifications, surgical sinus node exclusion, and sinus or AV node radiofrequency catheter ablation.
- Medication: Ivabradine and beta-blockers.
- Frequency: 1.16% in the general population

Inappropriate sinus tachycardia (IST) is defined as sinus tachycardia that is not caused by identifiable medical ailments, a physiological reaction, or pharmaceuticals (a diagnosis of exclusion) and is accompanied by symptoms, frequently invalidating and affecting quality of life. IST symptoms include palpitations, chest discomfort, exhaustion, shortness of breath, presyncope, and syncope.

While sinus tachycardia is very common and is the most common type of tachycardia, it is rare to be diagnosed with inappropriate sinus tachycardia as an independent symptom that is not part of a larger condition. Although somewhat rarely diagnosed, IST is viewed by most to be a benign condition in the long-term. Symptoms of IST, however, may be distracting and warrant treatment. The heart is a strong muscle and typically can sustain the higher-than-normal heart rhythm, though monitoring the condition is generally recommended. The mechanism and primary etiology of inappropriate sinus tachycardia has not been fully elucidated. An autoimmune mechanism has been suggested, as several studies have detected autoantibodies that activate beta adrenoreceptors in some patients. The mechanism of the arrhythmia primarily involves the sinus node and peri-nodal tissue and does not require the AV node for maintenance. Treatments in the form of pharmacological therapy or catheter ablation are available, but the condition is currently difficult to treat successfully.

== Signs and symptoms ==
Palpitations are the most common symptom in roughly 90% of patients. Other symptoms include chest pain, fatigue, shortness of breath, presyncope, syncope, reduced exercise tolerance, anxiety, panic attacks, and headaches. These symptoms are usually associated with an elevated heart rate. While some patients have persistently elevated sinus rates, others have paroxysmal episodes with normal heart rates in between.

== Causes ==
The exact cause of Inappropriate sinus tachycardia is still being debated and remains unknown. Several mechanisms have been suggested, including increased sympathetic or decreased parasympathetic drive, increased intrinsic heart rate, dysfunctional neurohormonal modulation, ectopic sinus node activity, and beta-adrenergic receptor autoantibodies. Some data show an abnormal response to autonomic stimulation as a result of tissue/cell level changes (intrinsic mechanism), whereas others show a disruption of the autonomic stimulation itself with normal tissues/cell level findings (extrinsic mechanism). It is possible that both mechanistic theories are correct because, despite sharing a single common pathway of sinus tachycardia, individual patients' underlying mechanistic etiologies may differ.

== Mechanism ==
Over 15 electrical currents tightly control the sinus node. The calcium clock and the funny current appear to be the most important currents in regulating sinus node rate. Sinus activation and thus heart rate is regulated further through the autonomic nervous system. At rest, the sinus node is primarily regulated by tonic and phasic parasympathetic activation in normal, healthy individuals. Exercise causes vagal activation, sympathetic activation, and increases in catecholamine levels, which raises sinus rates. Any aspect of regular regulatory processes influencing sinus rate may be compromised in patients with IST.

== Diagnosis ==
Inappropriate sinus tachycardia is diagnosed when there is persistent or recurrent sinus tachycardia on a 12-lead electrogram or long-term monitoring that is not explained by other means. Invasive testing, such as electrophysiology studies, are not helpful in making the diagnosis, but they may be useful in ruling out a concomitant supraventricular tachycardia mechanism. Inappropriate sinus tachycardia is a diagnosis of exclusion that is rarely made in an asymptomatic patient.

The following criteria are commonly used to define inappropriate sinus tachycardia:

1. The axis and morphology of the P wave during tachycardia similar to or identical to that experienced during sinus rhythm
2. A resting heart rate of 100 beats per minute or an increase in heart rate of 100 beats per minute with minimal exertion
3. Excluding any potential secondary causes of sinus tachycardia
4. Ruling out atrial tachycardias
5. Palpitations or presyncope (or both) symptoms that have been clearly linked to resting or easily induced sinus tachycardia.

Secondary causes of sinus tachycardia must be ruled out and corrected if present. A full endocrinology evaluation for disease entities such as hyperthyroidism, pheochromocytoma, and diabetes mellitus with evidence of autonomic dysfunction should be included in the evaluation for inappropriate sinus tachycardia.

=== Differential diagnosis ===
Inappropriate sinus tachycardia is primarily a diagnosis of exclusion. Upon exertion, an inappropriate heart rate response of sinus tachycardia can be seen in some inborn errors of metabolism that result in metabolic myopathies, such as McArdle disease (GSD-V) and hereditary myopathy with lactic acidosis (Larsson–Linderholm syndrome).

Sinus tachycardia is a feature of both postural orthostatic tachycardia syndrome and Inappropriate sinus tachycardia. In POTS, there's an abnormal response by the autonomic nervous system when standing up. POTS symptoms are most common when the patient is upright. POTS syndromes and inappropriate sinus tachycardia may overlap, raising the possibility of shared mechanisms. The most common symptoms of POTS are dizziness and, on occasion, syncope, which are also common in IST.

Sinus node reentry is another differential diagnosis for Inappropriate sinus tachycardia. An ectopic atrial rhythm occurring near the sinus node may also mimic Inappropriate sinus tachycardia. Syncope or pre-syncope may occur in IST patients and be the dominant symptom, with associated prodromal symptoms such as diaphoresis and visual blurring, leading to the diagnosis of vasovagal syncope and the diagnosis of IST being overlooked.

== Treatment ==
Inappropriate sinus tachycardia is a chronic medical condition that has a negative impact on one's quality of life. There are numerous treatment options available, which are frequently combined with nonpharmacologic lifestyle and dietary changes. It is frequently advised to avoid triggers or stimulants such as caffeine, nicotine, and alcohol.

Managing inappropriate sinus tachycardia, controlling symptoms and decreasing rate, remains a significant challenge, especially given the ambiguity of the syndrome itself. Controlling the heart rate, on the other hand, does not always result in the elimination of symptoms. Controlling sinus rate in asymptomatic IST patients is debatable given that the treatment may be worse than the syndrome itself. In IST, no single therapy completely and effectively reduces heart rate and symptoms, which is likely due to the problem's complexity and a lack of a complete understanding of the causes.

In most patients, sleeping with the head of the bed elevated and increasing plasma volume through generous salt and fluid intake can be beneficial with minimal risk. In patients with venous pooling, compression stockings can offer additional benefits; however, adherence often becomes an issue. These lifestyle changes may alleviate symptoms and prevent reflex tachycardia, which is especially common in chronic dehydration. In patients with overt psychosomatic complaints, it is acceptable to consider a psychiatric evaluation.

Pharmacologic therapy for Inappropriate sinus tachycardia patients should be started gradually, with the goal of lowering HR and improving symptoms. The pharmacologic treatment of IST is empirical, with a trial-and-error approach typically employed.

Beta blockers are the first-line treatment for inappropriate sinus tachycardia. β-blockers, in general, alleviate symptoms. Patients with β-adrenergic receptor sensitivity and elevated catecholamine levels throughout orthostatic stress usually respond well to a variety of β-blockers. Nondihydropyridine calcium channel blockers have demonstrated a modest benefit in symptom control of IST in patients with contraindications to β-blockers.

Other drugs, such as sympatholytics and cholinesterase inhibitors like pyridostigmine, have very limited clinical evidence. There have been no randomized controlled trials regarding the use of these drugs in the treatment of Inappropriate sinus tachycardia, and all, with the possible exception of β-blockers, should be considered off-label indications.

Ivabradine has been shown to reduce HR, improve exercise capacity quantitatively, and reduce subjective symptom burden. The drug appears to have a lower proarrhythmic risk and is well tolerated. Ivabradine shows great promise as the possible therapy of choice for beta-blocker intolerant or suboptimally responsive patients with a chronic condition that frequently becomes clinically problematic in management.

There are no specific guidelines in place to determine which patients with inappropriate sinus tachycardia should be considered for invasive treatments. Interventions to treat inappropriate sinus tachycardia range from surgical sinus node exclusion to sinus or AV node radiofrequency catheter ablation, which typically is followed by permanent pacemaker implantation and, in recent years, radiofrequency sinus node modification.

Several clinical trials have described sinus node modification or ablation in Inappropriate sinus tachycardia. Primary success rates are generally good, however, there is a high rate of symptom recurrence and significant complication rates. These complications include the need for permanent pacing, transient superior vena cava syndrome, and temporary or permanent paralysis of the phrenic nerve. Furthermore, sinus node modification or ablation may not alleviate all IST-related symptoms. There is also no consensus on the best approach, which includes modifications or ablation, open chest versus conventional intravascular access, and mapping methods. Finally, there has been no evidence of symptomatic improvement over time.

== Outlook ==
IST has a generally benign prognosis. One possible reason for a favourable prognosis is that, while IST patients have faster heart rates, their heart rate slows slightly during sleep as well as during various diurnal patterns. Long-term consequences are few, but published studies are small, follow-up is limited, and populations are varied. Although there have been isolated reports, IST is rarely associated with tachycardia-induced cardiomyopathy. Symptoms may last for years but tend not to progress and may eventually fade away.

== Epidemiology ==
Inappropriate sinus tachycardia, defined as 24-hour average HR > 90 bpm and HR > 100 bpm in a supine or sitting position, has a prevalence of 1.16% in the general population. The epidemiology of Inappropriate sinus tachycardia is not well understood. IST can occur at any age, but it is most common in adolescents and young adults. Inappropriate sinus tachycardia was previously thought to be a rare condition affecting young women, with health professionals being overrepresented. This characterization may better define the group of IST patients who are most symptomatic and/or likely to seek medical attention, as opposed to the entire cohort of Inappropriate sinus tachycardia patients.

In IST, the most common comorbidities are psychiatric, including a history of depression in 25.6% as well as anxiety in 24.6%. Higher rates of diabetes mellitus, hypertension, and hypothyroidism have been identified in those with IST, though lower rates of hyperthyroidism have been observed. 28.2% of patients reported an event or physical condition preceding the onset of IST symptoms. Pregnancy was the most common identifiable initiating factor in IST patients (7.9%).

== See also ==
- Supraventricular tachycardia
- Sinus tachycardia
- Postural orthostatic tachycardia syndrome
- Dysautonomia
- Metabolic myopathies
