= Process of elimination =

Method of identifying an entity of interest

Process of elimination is a logical method to identify an entity of interest among several ones by excluding all other entities. In educational testing, it is a process of deleting options in which the possibility of an option being correct is close to zero or significantly lower than that of other options. This version of the process does not guarantee success, even if only one option remains, since it eliminates possibilities merely on the grounds that they are improbable. The process of elimination can only narrow down the possibilities; thus, if the correct option is not among the known options, it will not arrive at the truth.

== Method ==
The method of elimination is iterative. One looks at the answers, determines that several answers are unfit, eliminates these, and repeats until one cannot eliminate any more. This iteration is most effectively applied when there is logical structure between the answers – that is to say, when by eliminating an answer one can eliminate several others. In this case one can find the answers that one cannot eliminate by eliminating any other answers and testing them alone – the others are eliminated as a logical consequence; this is the idea behind optimizations for computerized searches when the input is sorted, as, for instance, in binary search.

For the method to work it is necessary to list all possible, even improbable, possibilities. Any omissions render the method invalid as a logical method.

== Applications ==
=== Medicine ===
A process of elimination can be used to reach a diagnosis of exclusion. It is an underlying method in performing a differential diagnosis.

=== Criminal investigation ===
According to Sherlock Holmes, the process of elimination is a tool of criminal investigation: "When you have eliminated the impossible, whatever remains, however improbable, must be the truth."

== See also ==
- Disjunctive syllogism
- Law of excluded middle
- Philosophical razor
- Troubleshooting
- twenty questions Spoken word game using logic.
