= Adrenergic receptor autoantibodies =

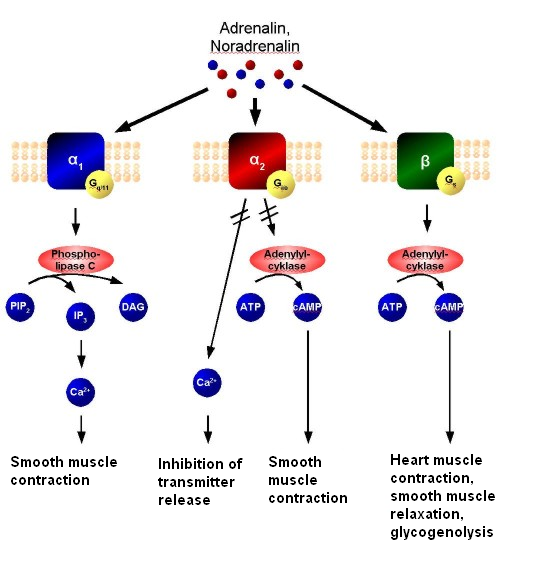
The mechanism of adrenergic receptors. Adrenaline or noradrenaline are receptor ligands to either α_{1}, α_{2} or β-adrenergic receptors. α_{1} couples to G_{q}, which results in increased intracellular Ca^{2+} and subsequent smooth muscle contraction. α_{2}, on the other hand, couples to G_{i}, which causes a decrease in neurotransmitter release, as well as a decrease of cAMP activity resulting in smooth muscle contraction. β receptors couple to G_{s}, and increases intracellular cAMP activity, resulting in e.g. heart muscle contraction, smooth muscle relaxation and glycogenolysis.

Adrenergic receptor autoantibodies are autoantibodies (antibodies directed against a person's own protein) targeting adrenergic receptors.

The adrenergic receptors (or adrenoreceptors) are a class of cell membrane-bound receptors throughout the body that are targets of the catecholamines, especially norepinephrine (or noradrenaline) and epinephrine (or adrenaline). The binding to these receptors by catecholamines will generally stimulate the sympathetic nervous system, the arm of the autonomic nervous system responsible for the fight-or-flight response.

The implications of high titers of these circulating antibodies are still being researched. There is evidence that autoimmunity against this class of G protein-coupled receptors can result in a variety of pathologies.

== Cardiovascular diseases and events ==
Circulating autoantibodies to adrenergic receptors have been identified in numerous heart diseases and cardiac symptoms. Laboratory models have revealed a mechanism by which adrenergic autoantibodies accomplish their effects on the cardiovascular system. β_{1}-Adrenergic receptor autoantibodies can trigger conformational changes in the receptors and attenuate receptor internalization. The combination of these effects can produce bimodeal effects on receptor signaling that influence basal activity and chronotropic catecholamine responses in cardiomyocytes.

β_{1}-Adrenergic receptors are a major signaling receptor in the heart and, therefore, autoantibodies to these receptors have been tied to many different heart diseases. For example, autoantibodies to β_{1}-adrenergic receptors are linked to chronic heart failure. However, it has been proposed that both β_{1}-adrenergic receptor polymorphisms and autoantibodies could be working together in the development of chronic heart failure. Cardiomyopathy due to autoimmune dysregulation and production of autoantibodies has been seen in humans and reproduced in animal models. In rabbit models, increased expression of autoantibodies has been directly correlated with induction of atrial fibrillation. In canine models inoculated with adrenergic autoantibodies, it has been shown that beta blockers can negate certain cardiac arrhythmias. Refractory hypertension associated with autoantibodies to β_{1}-adrenergic receptors has been documented in diabetic people.

While the exact pathophysiology of Chagas disease (American trypanosomiasis), a parasitic disease caused by Trypanosoma cruzi infection, is not completely understood, some research suggests that an overstimulation of the immune system by the condition causes production of adrenergic autoantibodies. Research is investigating the impact of these autoantibodies and whether they correlate with the symptomatology of Chagas disease.

== Specific conditions ==
=== Postural orthostatic tachycardia syndrome ===
Some research suggests that there may be an autoimmune basis for postural orthostatic tachycardia syndrome (POTS), a condition that presents as chronic impairment of the autonomic nervous system. Studies have correlated autoantibodies to the β-adrenergic receptors in the condition. The level of disability in people with POTS has been compared to the quality of life experienced in conditions like chronic obstructive pulmonary disease (COPD) or congestive heart failure. With the vast and vague symptomatology, and no previously known etiology, diagnosis and treatment often proves elusive and challenging. The identification of these antibodies and the development of better testing may eventually allow for more targeted therapies and better treatment outcomes.

=== Myalgic encephalomyelitis/chronic fatigue syndrome ===
Myalgic encephalomyelitis/chronic fatigue syndrome (ME/CFS), a disease characterized by profound fatigue, sleep abnormalities, pain, and other symptoms that are made worse by exertion, well-known for its confounding etiology. Studies suggest a connection between infection-trigger and disease onset in some ME/CFS patients. These individuals have shown significantly elevated antibodies to β_{2}-adrenergic receptors.

=== Others ===
Studies have observed that activating autoantibodies to the β_{1}- and β_{2}-adrenergic receptors and M_{2} muscarinic acetylcholine receptors is associated with atrial tachyarrhythmias in patients with hyperthyroidism. Additional research into the prevalence of these biomarkers in Grave's disease (Grave's hyperthyroidism) showed facilitated triggering of pulmonary veins and atrial fibrillation.

Adrenergic autoantibodies have been linked to Buerger's disease (thromboangiitis obliterans). Buerger's disease is a rare disease in which the arteries and veins in the arms and legs become inflamed, swell, and can become blocked with blood clots.
