= AK2 =

Protein-coding gene in humans

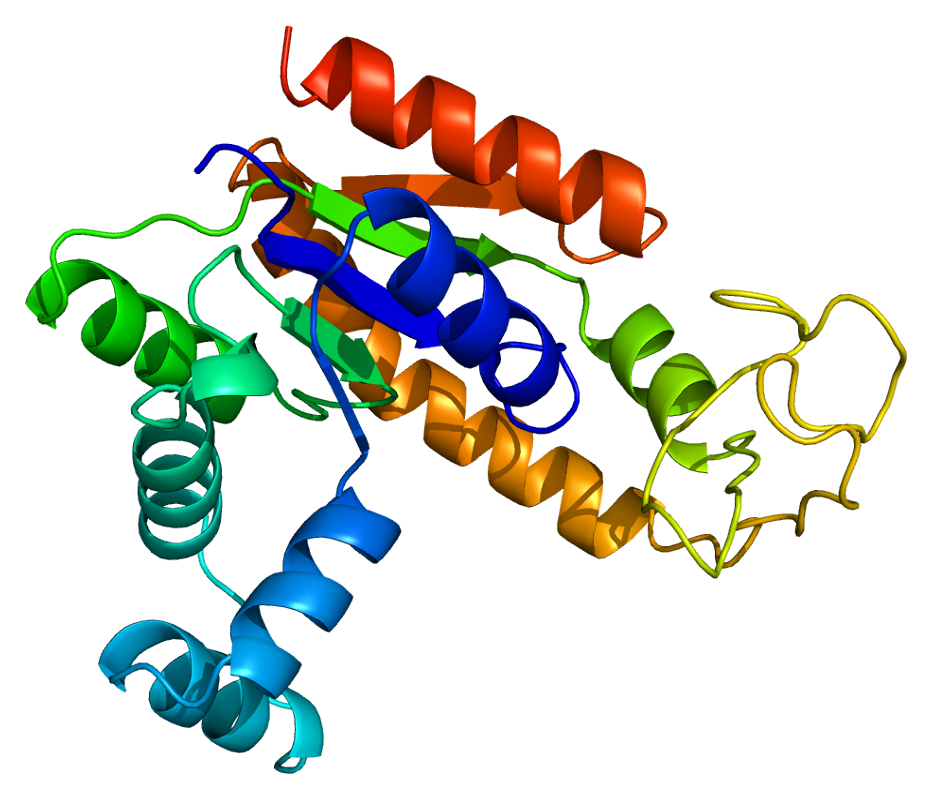

Identifiers
- Aliases: AK2, ADK2, AK 2, adenylate kinase 2
- External IDs: OMIM: 103020; MGI: 87978; GeneCards: AK2
Available structures
PDB	Ortholog search: PDBe RCSB
PDB	List of PDB id codes 2C9Y
Enzyme activity
EC #	BRENDA	ExPASy	KEGG	MetaCyc
2.7.4.3	↗	↗	↗	↗

Gene location (Human)
Chr.	Chromosome 1 (human)
Band	1p35.1	Start	33,007,986 bp
Band	1p35.1	End	33,080,996 bp

Gene location (Mouse)
Chr.	Chromosome 4 (mouse)
Band	4 D2.2|4 62.62 cM	Start	128,885,751 bp
Band	4 D2.2|4 62.62 cM	End	128,905,322 bp
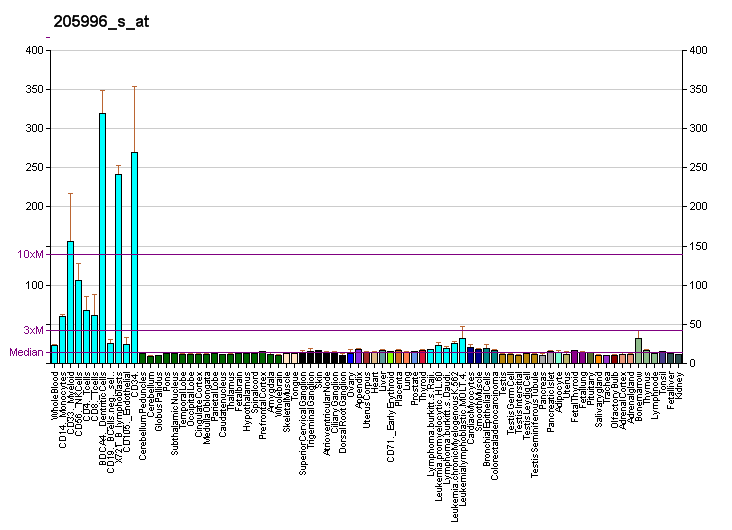

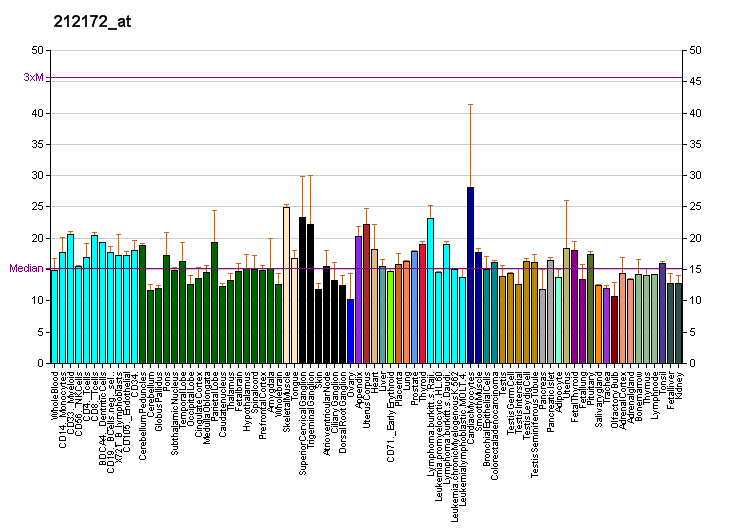

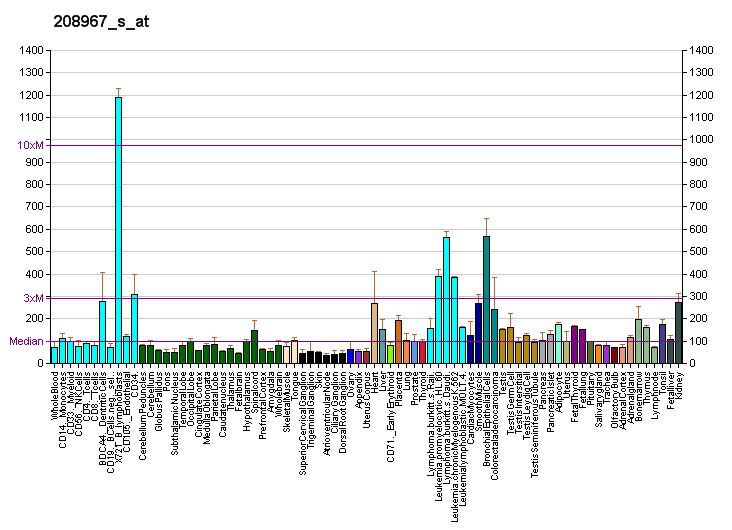
RNA expression pattern
Bgee	Human / Mouse (ortholog); Top expressed in: rectum; mucosa of transverse colon; epithelium of colon; gastrocnemius muscle; right auricle of heart; left lobe of thyroid gland; right lobe of thyroid gland; right lobe of liver; apex of heart; left adrenal cortex / Top expressed in: right kidney; jejunum; brown adipose tissue; duodenum; crypt of lieberkuhn of small intestine; proximal tubule; left lobe of liver; granulocyte; primary oocyte; white adipose tissue; More reference expression data
BioGPS	More reference expression data
Gene ontology
Molecular function	transferase activity; nucleotide binding; phosphotransferase activity, phosphate group as acceptor; kinase activity; nucleobase-containing compound kinase activity; ATP binding; adenylate kinase activity
Cellular component	sperm mitochondrial sheath; mitochondrial intermembrane space; sperm flagellum; mitochondrion; mitochondrial inner membrane; extracellular exosome
Biological process	nucleobase-containing small molecule interconversion; phosphorylation; nucleobase-containing compound metabolic process; ADP biosynthetic process; nucleotide phosphorylation; AMP metabolic process; ATP metabolic process; nucleoside monophosphate phosphorylation
Sources:Amigo / QuickGO
Orthologs
Databases	NCBI: entry; OMA: entry
Species	Human	Mouse
Entrez	204	11637
Ensembl	ENSG00000004455	ENSMUSG00000028792
UniProt	P54819	Q9WTP6
RefSeq (mRNA)	NM_001199199; NM_001625; NM_013411; NM_001319139; NM_001319140 NM_001319141; NM_001319142; NM_001319143; NM_172199	NM_001033966; NM_016895
RefSeq (protein)	NP_001186128; NP_001306068; NP_001306069; NP_001306070; NP_001306071 NP_001306072; NP_001616; NP_037543	NP_001029138; NP_058591
Location (UCSC)	Chr 1: 33.01 – 33.08 Mb	Chr 4: 128.89 – 128.91 Mb
PubMed search
- Wikidata
View/Edit Human	View/Edit Mouse

Adenylate kinase 2 is an enzyme that is encoded in humans by the AK2 gene. The AK2 protein is found in the intermembrane space of the mitochondrion.

== Function ==
Adenylate kinases are involved in regulating the adenine nucleotide composition within a cell by catalyzing the reversible transfer of phosphate groups among adenine nucleotides. Three isozymes of adenylate kinase, namely 1, 2, and 3, have been identified in vertebrates; this gene encodes isozyme 2. Expression of these isozymes is tissue-specific and developmentally regulated. Isozyme 2 is localized in the mitochondrial intermembrane space and may play a role in apoptosis. Two transcript variants encoding distinct isoforms have been identified for this gene.

=== AK2 deficiency ===
Adenylate Kinase 2 (AK2) deficiency in humans causes hematopoietic defects associated with sensorineural deafness. Reticular dysgenesis is an autosomal recessive form of human combined immunodeficiency. It is also characterized by an impaired lymphoid maturation and early differentiation arrest in the myeloid lineage. AK2 deficiency results in absent or a large decrease in the expression of proteins. AK2 is specifically expressed in the stria vascularis of the inner ear which indicates why individuals with an AK2 deficiency will have sensorineural deafness.
