= L. D. McArdle =

American politician

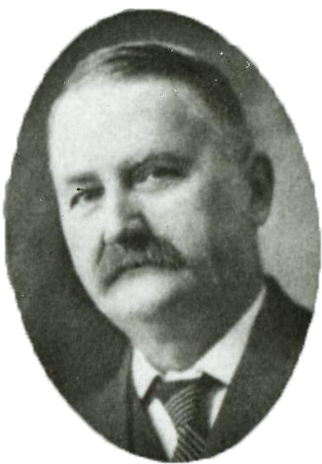
- McArdle in 1913

Member of the Washington House of Representatives for the 33rd district
- In office 1911–1917

Personal details
- Born: June 25, 1857 Ohio, United States
- Died: November 8, 1938 (aged 81) Seattle, Washington, United States
- Party: Republican

Lucian D. McArdle (June 25, 1857 – November 8, 1938) was an American politician in the state of Washington. He served in the Washington House of Representatives.
