= Sean McArdle =

Sean McArdle may refer to:

- Sean McArdle (author), American comic book author, filmmaker and college professor at Kent State University, Ohio
- Sean McArdle (footballer) (born 2007), Scottish footballer playing at Celtic F.C. B Team and Academy
- Sean McArdle (musician), American guitarist and singer
