= Reticular dysgenesis =

- Other names: AK2 deficiency, Congenital aleukocytosis, De Vaal disease, Generalized hematopoietic hypoplasia, SCID with leukopenia
- Reticular dysgenesis is inherited in an autosomal recessive manner
- Specialty: Hematology

Reticular dysgenesis (RD) is a rare, inherited autosomal recessive disease that results in immunodeficiency. Individuals with RD have mutations in both copies of the AK2 gene. Mutations in this gene lead to absence of AK2 protein. AK2 protein allows hematopoietic stem cells to differentiate and proliferate. Hematopoietic stem cells give rise to blood cells.

Differentiation and proliferation of hematopoietic stem cells require a lot of energy and this energy is supplied by the mitochondria. The energy metabolism of mitochondria is regulated by the AK2 protein. If there is a mutation in the protein, that means that the mitochondria metabolism most likely will be altered and will not be able to provide enough energy to the hematopoietic stem cells. As a result, hematopoietic stem cells will not be able to differentiate or proliferate.

The immune system consists of specialized cells that work together to fight off bacteria, fungi and viruses. These cells include T lymphocytes (T cells), that primarily mediate the immune system, B lymphocytes (B cells) and Natural Killer cells. Patients with RD have a genetic defect that affects the T cells and at least one other type of immune cell. Since more than one type of immune cell is affected, this disease is classified as a severe combined immunodeficiency disease (SCID). A weakened immune system leaves patients susceptible to different kinds of infection. Commonly, patients who are diagnosed with RD also have bacterial sepsis and/or pneumonia. The annual incidence has been estimated at 1/3,000,000-1/5,000,000 and both females and males are affected.

== Signs and symptoms ==
Signs and Symptoms	Approximate Number of Patients Affected
Abnormality of mitochondria metabolism	90%
Abnormality of Neutrophils	90%
Anemia	90%
Aplasia/Hypoplasia of the thymus	90%
Cellular immunodeficiency	90%
Decreased antibody level in blood	90%
Diarrhea	90%
Hearing Impairment	90%
Recurrent respiratory infection	90%
Sepsis	90%
Abnormality of temperature regulation	50%
Malabsorption	50%
Weight Loss	50%
Dehydration	7.5%
Skin rash	7.5%
Skin Ulcer	7.5%

== Risk factors ==
- Condition follows an autosomal recessive pattern
  - The mutated gene must be inherited from both the mother and father
  - Both males and females must have an equal frequency of inheritance

== Diagnosis ==
Health professionals must look at a person's history, symptoms, physical exam and laboratory test in order to make a diagnosis. If the results show patients with low levels of lymphocytes, absence of granulocytes or absence of thymus then the patient may be suspected to have RD.

== Treatment ==
RD can only be treated temporarily through hematopoietic stem cell transplantation (HSCT) and cytokine therapy.

=== Hematopoietic stem cell transplantation ===
Transplantation of stem cells are taken from the bone marrow, peripheral blood or umbilical cord of healthy, matched donors. Hematopoietic stem cell transplantation (HSCT) involves intravenous infusion of stem cells to those who have either a damaged bone marrow or defective immune system. Transplantation is a simple process. Bone marrow product is infused through a central vein over a period of several hours. The hematopoietic cells are able to go to the bone marrow through tracking mechanisms. Patients who suffer from RD will now have more stem cells that can differentiate into immune cells.

=== Cytokine Therapy ===
Recombinant granulocyte-macrophage colony-stimulating factor (rGM-CSF) can be used as a temporary cure. GM-CSF stimulates production of white blood cells. This cure is commonly used in patients who are awaiting bone marrow transplantation. Response to this cure can vary. Those with a more severe combined immunodeficiency may have no response to this therapy.

== Prognosis ==
The survival range is estimated to be 3 days to 17 weeks without treatment. Patients die due to bacterial or viral infections. Aggressive treatment with antibiotics is required and bone marrow transplant is common. Patients undergoing bone marrow transplant, specifically from a matched sibling, have a higher 5 year survival rate than those receiving a transplant from other donors.

== Research ==
=== Gene Therapy ===
Gene therapy is a relatively new concept in the field of SCID. This therapy is currently undergoing clinical trial and has cured a small number of children suffering from X-linked SCID and recessive allele SCID. Gene therapy aims to correct the underlying genetic abnormality in SCID. In the case of RD, the genetic abnormality would be AK2 malfunction. Stem cells are taken from an affected child's blood or bone marrow. Then in laboratory conditions the stem cells are manipulated and corrected with gene technology. They are then injected back into the patient. Similarly, in bone transplant, stem cells are able to find their way back through tracking mechanisms.
