= Anne McArdle =

Physiologist at the University of Liverpool

- Education: University of Liverpool
- Scientific career
- Workplaces: University of Liverpool
- Thesis: Mechanisms skeletal muscle damage in the dystrophin-deficient MDX mouse (1993)
- Website: www.liverpool.ac.uk/ageing-and-chronic-disease/staff/anne-mcardle/

Anne McArdle is a physiologist at the University of Liverpool.

== Education ==
McArdle graduated with a Bachelor's in Biochemistry from the University of Liverpool in 1988 and completed her PhD studying muscle damage using the mdx mouse model of Duchenne muscular dystrophy.

== Career and research ==
McArdle undertook postdoctoral training at the University of Michigan in the laboratories of John Faulkner and was awarded a Research into Ageing Fellowship in 1998 working on sarcopenia. She was appointed as Professor at the University of Liverpool in 2007 and has served as Head of the Department of musculoskeletal biology.
