= Adenylate kinase =

Class of enzymes

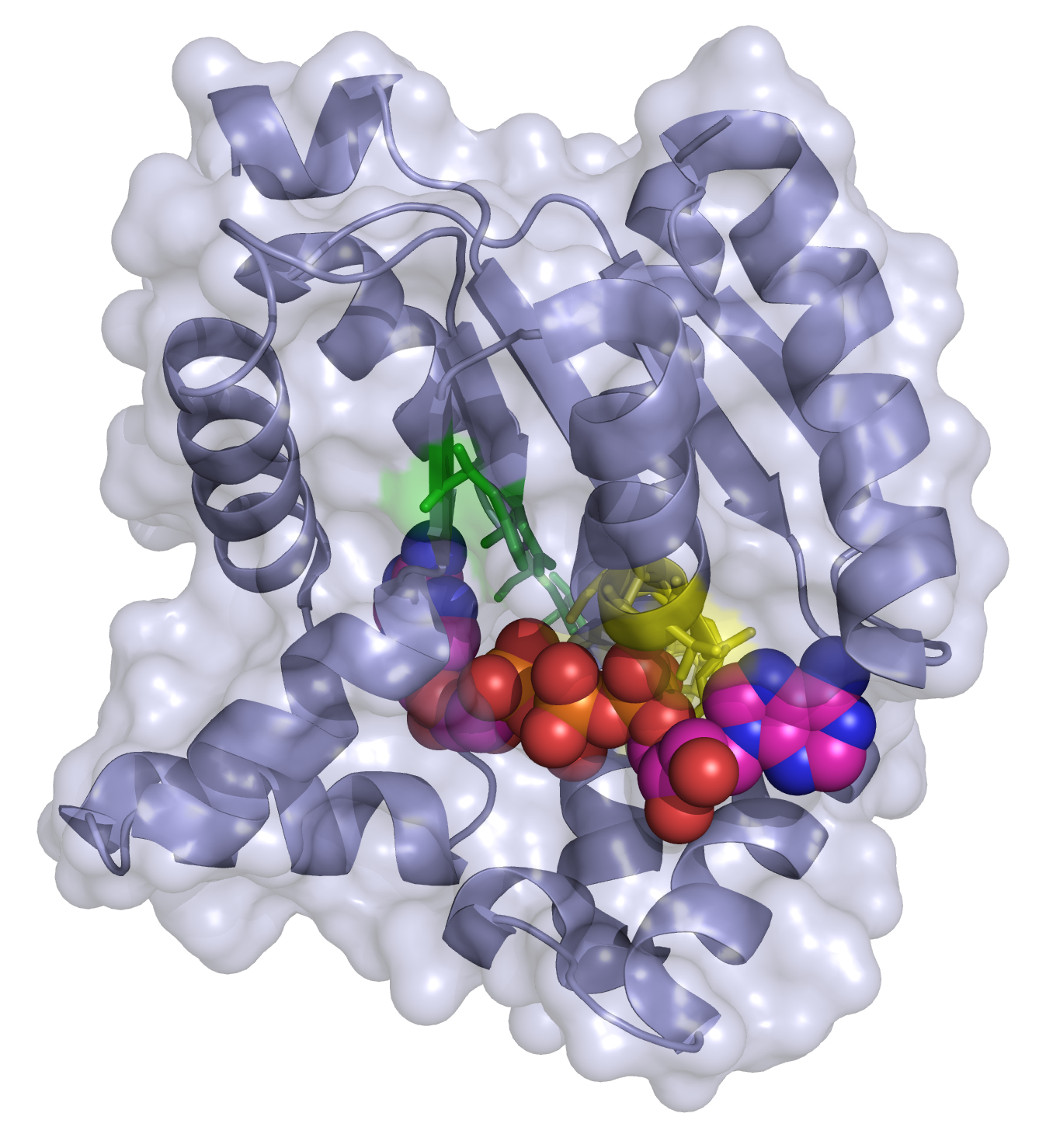
- 3D ribbon/surface model of adenylate kinase in complex with bis(adenosine)tetraphosphate (ADP-ADP)

Identifiers
- Symbol: ADK
- Pfam: PF00406
- InterPro: IPR000850
- PROSITE: PDOC00104
- SCOP2: 1ake / SCOPe / SUPFAM
Available protein structures:
- PDB: IPR000850 PF00406 (ECOD; PDBsum)
- AlphaFold: IPR000850; PF00406

Adenylate kinase (EC 2.7.4.3) (also known as ADK or myokinase) is a phosphotransferase enzyme that catalyzes the interconversion of the various adenosine phosphates (ATP, ADP, and AMP). By constantly monitoring phosphate nucleotide levels inside the cell, ADK plays an important role in cellular energy homeostasis.

ADK_lid
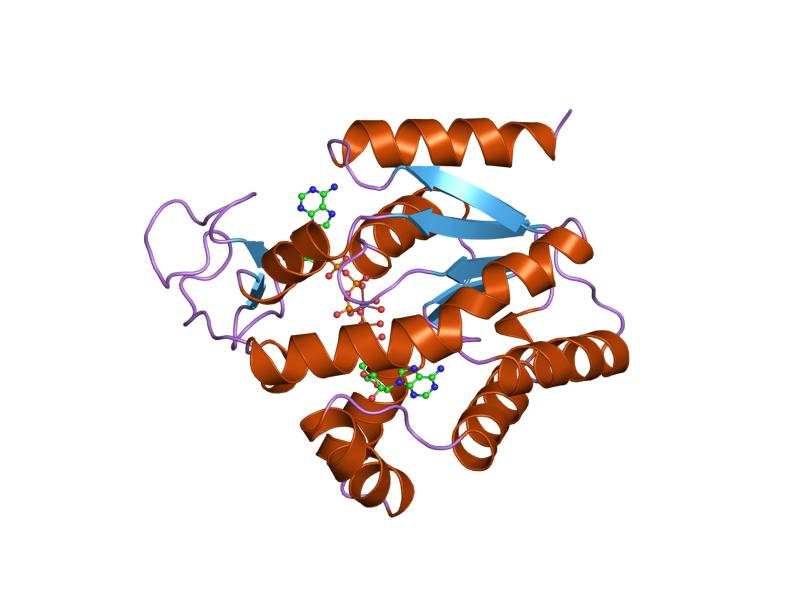
- Bacillus stearothermophilus adenylate kinase

Identifiers
- Symbol: ADK_lid
- Pfam: PF05191
- InterPro: IPR007862
- PROSITE: PDOC00104
- SCOP2: 1ake / SCOPe / SUPFAM
Available protein structures:
- PDB: IPR007862 PF05191 (ECOD; PDBsum)
- AlphaFold: IPR007862; PF05191

Adenylate kinase

Identifiers
- EC no.: 2.7.4.3
- CAS no.: 2598011

Databases
- BRENDA: enzyme data
- ExPASy: NiceZyme view
- KEGG: enzyme entry
- MetaCyc: metabolic pathway
- Rhea: reactions
- PDB structures: RCSB PDB PDBe PDBsum
Search
- PMC: articles
- PubMed: articles
- NCBI: proteins

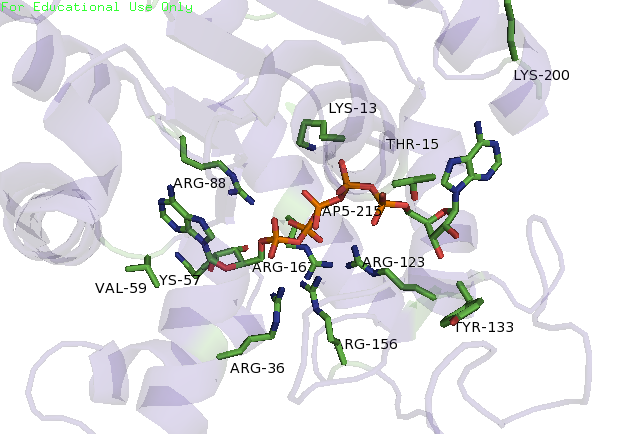
PDB image 3HPQ showing the ADK enzyme skeleton in cartoon and the key residues as sticks and labeled according to their placement in E. coli, crystallized with Ap5A inhibitor.

== Substrate and products ==
The reaction catalyzed is:

adenosine triphosphate
+
adenosine monophosphate
2
adenosine diphosphate

The equilibrium constant varies with condition, but it is close to 1. Thus, ΔG^{o} for this reaction is close to zero. In muscle from a variety of species of vertebrates and invertebrates, the concentration of ATP is typically 7-10 times that of ADP, and usually greater than 100 times that of AMP. The rate of oxidative phosphorylation is controlled by the availability of ADP. Thus, the mitochondrion attempts to keep ATP levels high due to the combined action of adenylate kinase and the controls on oxidative phosphorylation.

== Isozymes ==
To date there have been nine human ADK protein isoforms identified. While some of these are ubiquitous throughout the body, some are localized into specific tissues. For example, ADK7 and ADK8 are both only found in the cytosol of cells; and ADK7 is found in skeletal muscle whereas ADK8 is not. Not only do the locations of the various isoforms within the cell vary, but the binding of substrate to the enzyme and kinetics of the phosphoryl transfer are different as well. ADK1, the most abundant cytosolic ADK isozyme, has a Km about a thousand times higher than the Km of ADK7 and 8, indicating a much weaker binding of ADK1 to AMP. Sub-cellular localization of the ADK enzymes is done by including a targeting sequence in the protein. Each isoform also has different preference for NTP's. Some will only use ATP, whereas others will accept GTP, UTP, and CTP as the phosphoryl carrier.

Some of these isoforms prefer other NTP's entirely. There is a mitochondrial GTP:AMP phosphotransferase, also specific for the phosphorylation of AMP, that can only use GTP or ITP as the phosphoryl donor. ADK has also been identified in different bacterial species and in yeast. Two further enzymes are known to be related to the ADK family, i.e. yeast uridine monophosphokinase and slime mold UMP-CMP kinase. Some residues are conserved across these isoforms, indicating how essential they are for catalysis. One of the most conserved areas includes an Arg residue, whose modification inactivates the enzyme, together with an Asp that resides in the catalytic cleft of the enzyme and participates in a salt bridge.

== Subfamilies ==
- Adenylate kinase, subfamily InterPro: IPR006259
- UMP-CMP kinase InterPro: IPR006266
- Adenylate kinase, isozyme 1 InterPro: IPR006267

== Mechanism ==
Phosphoryl transfer only occurs on closing of the 'open lid'. This causes an exclusion of water molecules that brings the substrates in proximity to each other, lowering the energy barrier for the nucleophilic attack by the α-phosphoryl of AMP on the γ-phosphoryl group of ATP resulting in formation of ADP by transfer of the γ-phosphoryl group to AMP. In the crystal structure of the ADK enzyme from E. coli with inhibitor Ap5A, the Arg88 residue binds the Ap5A at the α-phosphate group. It has been shown that the mutation R88G results in 99% loss of catalytic activity of this enzyme, suggesting that this residue is intimately involved in the phosphoryl transfer. Another highly conserved residue is Arg119, which lies in the adenosine binding region of the ADK, and acts to sandwich the adenine in the active site. It has been suggested that the promiscuity of these enzymes in accepting other NTP's is due to this relatively inconsequential interactions of the base in the ATP binding pocket. A network of positive, conserved residues (Lys13, Arg123, Arg156, and Arg167 in ADK from E. coli) stabilize the buildup of negative charge on phosphoryl group during the transfer. Two distal aspartate residues bind to the arginine network, causing the enzyme to fold and reduces its flexibility. A magnesium cofactor is also required, essential for increasing the electrophilicity of the phosphate on AMP, though this magnesium ion is only held in the active pocket by electrostatic interactions and dissociates easily.

== Structure ==
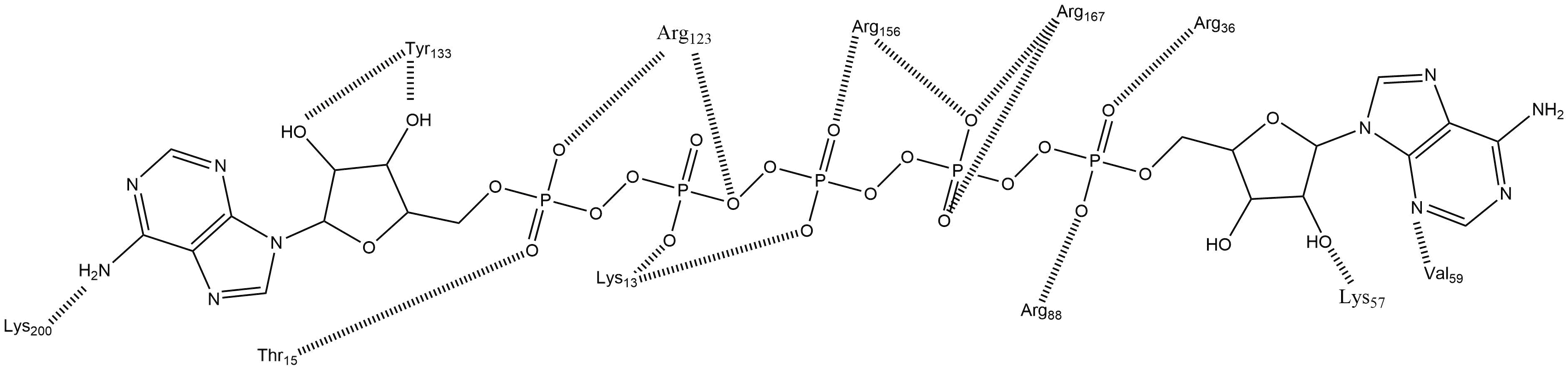
Residues of ADK_{E. coli} involved in substrate binding

Flexibility and plasticity allow proteins to bind to ligands, form oligomers, aggregate, and perform mechanical work. Large conformational changes in proteins play an important role in cellular signaling. Adenylate Kinase is a signal transducing protein; thus, the balance between conformations regulates protein activity. ADK has a locally unfolded state that becomes depopulated upon binding.

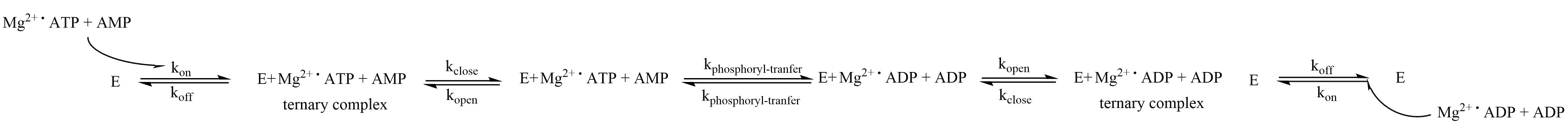
Describes the generic kinetic cycle of the ADK enzyme family. Ternary complex is labeled.

A 2007 study by Whitford et al. shows the conformations of ADK when binding with ATP or AMP. The study shows that there are three relevant conformations or structures of ADK—CORE, Open, and Closed. In ADK, there are two small domains called the LID and NMP. ATP binds in the pocket formed by the LID and CORE domains. AMP binds in the pocket formed by the NMP and CORE domains. The Whitford study also reported findings that show that localized regions of a protein unfold during conformational transitions. This mechanism reduces the strain and enhances catalytic efficiency. Local unfolding is the result of competing strain energies in the protein.

The local (thermodynamic) stability of the substrate-binding domains ATP_{lid} and AMP_{lid} has been shown to be significantly lower when compared with the CORE domain in ADK_{E. coli}. Furthermore, it has been shown that the two subdomains (ATP_{lid} and AMP_{lid}) can fold and unfold in a "non-cooperative manner." Binding of the substrates causes preference for 'closed' conformations amongst those that are sampled by ADK. These 'closed' conformations are hypothesized to help with removal of water from the active site to avoid wasteful hydrolysis of ATP in addition to helping optimize alignment of substrates for phosphoryl-transfer. Furthermore, it has been shown that the apoenzyme will still sample the 'closed' conformations of the ATP_{lid} and AMP_{lid} domains in the absence of substrates. When comparing the rate of opening of the enzyme (which allows for product release) and the rate of closing that accompanies substrate binding, closing was found to be the slower process.

== Function ==
=== Metabolic monitoring ===
The ability for a cell to dynamically measure energetic levels provides it with a method to monitor metabolic processes. By continually monitoring and altering the levels of ATP and the other adenyl phosphates (ADP and AMP levels) adenylate kinase is an important regulator of energy expenditure at the cellular level. As energy levels change under different metabolic stresses adenylate kinase is then able to generate AMP; which itself acts as a signaling molecule in further signaling cascades. This generated AMP can, for example, stimulate various AMP-dependent receptors such as those involved in glycolytic pathways, K-ATP channels, and 5' AMP-activated protein kinase (AMPK). Common factors that influence adenine nucleotide levels, and therefore ADK activity are exercise, stress, changes in hormone levels, and diet. It facilitates decoding of cellular information by catalyzing nucleotide exchange in the intimate "sensing zone" of metabolic sensors.

=== ADK shuttle ===
Adenylate kinase is present in mitochondrial and myofibrillar compartments in the cell, and it makes two high-energy phosphoryls (β and γ) of ATP available to be transferred between adenine nucleotide molecules. In essence, adenylate kinase shuttles ATP to sites of high energy consumption and removes the AMP generated over the course of those reactions. These sequential phosphotransfer relays ultimately result in propagation of the phosphoryl groups along collections of ADK molecules. This process can be thought of as a bucket brigade of ADK molecules that results in changes in local intracellular metabolic flux without apparent global changes in metabolite concentrations. This process is extremely important for overall homeostasis of the cell.

== Disease relevance ==
=== Nucleoside diphosphate kinase deficiency ===
Nucleoside diphosphate (NDP) kinase catalyzes in vivo ATP-dependent synthesis of ribo- and deoxyribonucleoside triphosphates. In mutated Escherichia coli that had a disrupted nucleoside diphosphate kinase, adenylate kinase performed dual enzymatic functions. ADK complements nucleoside diphosphate kinase deficiency.

=== AK1 and post-ischemic coronary reflow ===
Knock out of AK1 disrupts the synchrony between inorganic phosphate and turnover at ATP-consuming sites and ATP synthesis sites. This reduces the energetic signal communication in the post-ischemic heart and precipitates inadequate coronary reflow following ischemia-reperfusion.

=== ADK2 deficiency ===
Adenylate Kinase 2 (AK2) deficiency in humans causes hematopoietic defects associated with sensorineural deafness. Reticular dysgenesis is an autosomal recessive form of human combined immunodeficiency. It is also characterized by an impaired lymphoid maturation and early differentiation arrest in the myeloid lineage. AK2 deficiency results in absent or a large decrease in the expression of proteins. AK2 is specifically expressed in the stria vascularis of the inner ear which indicates why individuals with an AK2 deficiency will have sensorineural deafness.

=== Structural adaptations ===
AK1 genetic ablation decreases tolerance to metabolic stress. AK1 deficiency induces fiber-type specific variation in groups of transcripts in glycolysis and mitochondrial metabolism. This supports muscle energy metabolism.

== Plastidial ADK deficiency in Arabidopsis thaliana ==
Enhanced growth and elevated photosynthetic amino acid is associated with plastidial adenylate kinase deficiency in Arabidopsis thaliana.
