= Carbohydrate loading =

Dietic strategy in preparation for athletic endurance events

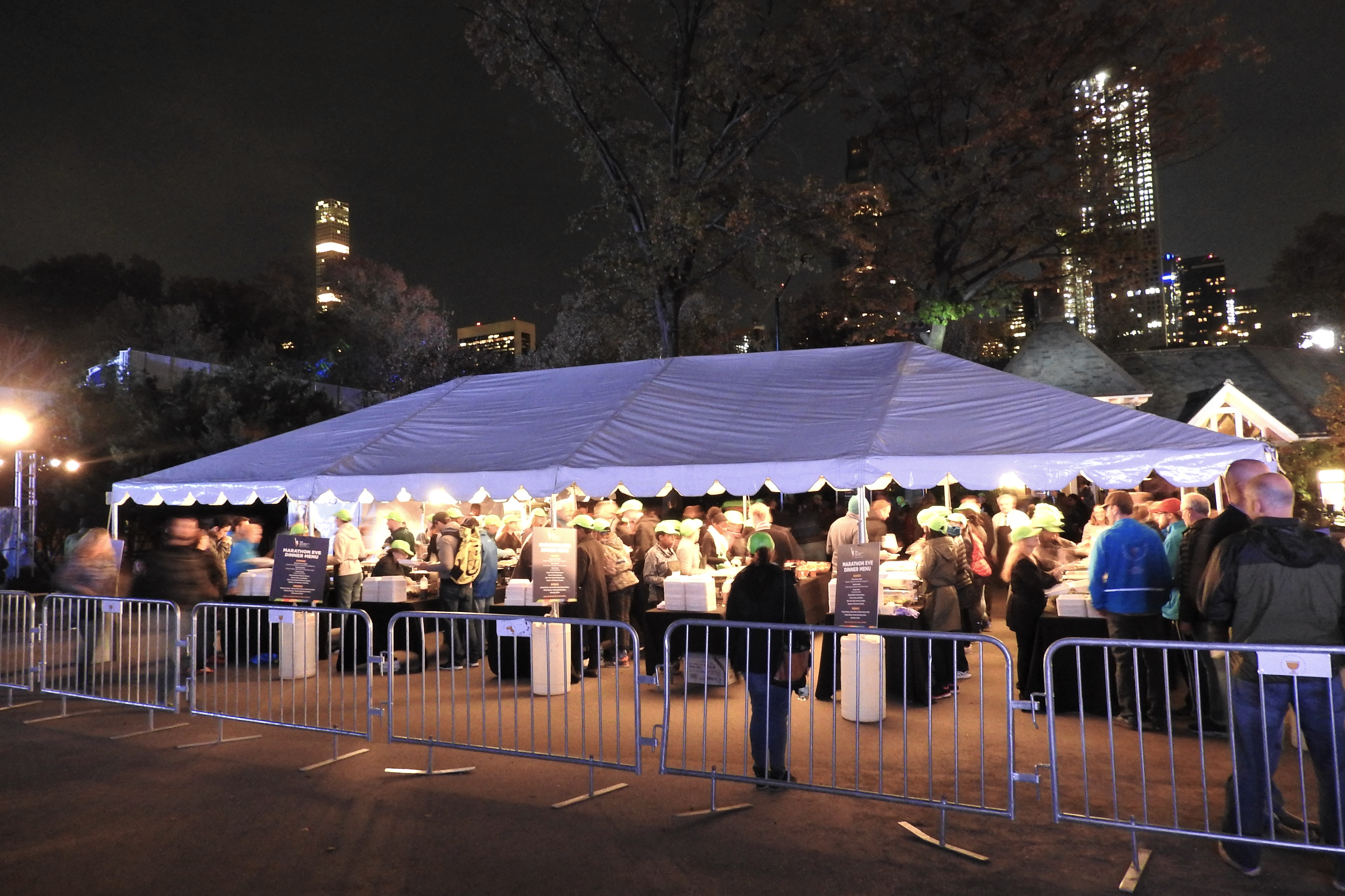
Pre-marathon meal

Carbohydrate (CHO) loading, commonly referred to as carb-loading, or carbo-loading, is a strategy used by endurance athletes, such as marathoners and triathletes, to reduce fatigue during an endurance event. While carbohydrates should be consumed both during and after an event, carb-loading is specifically referring to the consumption of carbohydrates before the event. This maximizes the storage of glycogen (or energy) in the muscles and liver to be used during the competition in order to prevent performance decline later on.

Carbohydrate loading is generally recommended for endurance events lasting longer than 90 minutes, but may still be utilized for shorter events. Foods with low glycemic indices are generally preferred for carbo-loading due to their minimal effect on blood glucose levels. Low glycemic foods commonly include vegetables, whole wheat pasta, and grains. Many endurance athletes have large pasta dinners the night before an event. Since muscles also use amino acids extensively when functioning within aerobic limits, meals should also include adequate protein. Large portions before a race can, however, decrease race-day performance if the digestive system has not had the time to process the food regimen.

== Specific recommendations ==
The composition of carbohydrates in the athlete's diet during carbohydrate loading is as important as their share of the overall caloric regimen.

Some examples of foods that are rich in carbohydrates include: bananas, with 30g CHO per 115g of the food itself, raisins, with 30g CHO per 36g, and oats, with 30g CHO per 67g.

Athletes performing for less than 90 minutes may still benefit from a higher carbohydrate diet prior to competition. In this case, the recommended amount of carbohydrates per kilogram of body weight is approximately 6-12g, and this is to be ingested 24 hours before the event. As for events lasting longer than 90 minutes, carbohydrate loading should begin 36-48 hours prior to the event, 10-12g CHO being consumed for every kilogram of body weight. This may vary for elite athletes, as many of these individuals begin carbo-loading 7-10 days prior.

== Types of carbohydrates ==
There are two types of carbohydrates, simple and complex, both serving different functions in terms of building up proper glycogen stores for an endurance event.

Most diets consist of both simple and complex carbohydrates which produces a variation of glucose, fructose, and galactose. These molecules are metabolized into glycogen within the liver and muscles. Consequently, sources of high-fructose carbohydrates, such as fruit and sugar-based foods, are less than optimal for the task. The classic carb-loading meal is pasta, whose caloric content is primarily due to starch, a polymer of glucose. Other high-starch meals which include bread, rice, and potatoes are also part of the correct regimen.

== Depletion phase ==
The first, and most preferred source of energy the body uses comes from the oxidation of CHO, which is the process of ATP being extracted from the muscles, and sometimes the liver, to provide the body with energy with the help of carbohydrates, or glycogen. Because of this preference for CHO usage to generate energy, an inadequate amount of carbohydrates, or glycogen, in the muscles and the liver will lead to a decrease in energy and increase fatigue, and in turn, an overall decline in performance nearing the end of an event, also known as carbohydrate depletion. Many marathon runners experience this phenomenon, typically described as "hitting the wall".

In endurance training or events that take 90 minutes, or more, to complete, the athlete may reach a point of extreme exhaustion, which correlates with depletion of glycogen in the working muscles.

== Previous carb-loading strategies ==
A new carbo-loading regimen developed by scientists at the University of Western Australia calls for a normal diet with light training until the day before the race. On the day before the race, the athlete performs a very short, extremely high-intensity workout (such as a few minutes of sprinting) then consumes 12 g of carbohydrate per kilogram of lean mass over the next 24 hours. The regimen resulted in a 90% increase in glycogen storage when compared to before the carbo-load, which is comparable to or higher than the results achieved with other 2 day – 6 day carbo-loading regimes.

== Limiting factors ==
Because of the possibility that some carbohydrate rich foods cause gastrointestinal issues, it's recommended that an athlete experiment with different sources before a race, during the training period.

Athletes may also experience an impaired performance due weight gain from water retention as it has been found that 2.7g of water is retained per 1g CHO.

Carbohydrate ingestion within 2 hours before aerobic exercise triggers elevated levels of insulin in the blood which may dramatically decrease blood glucose levels. This can limit aerobic performance, especially in events lasting longer than 60 minutes. This is known as transient or reactive hypoglycemia, and can be a limiting factor in elite athletes. Individuals susceptible to hypoglycemia are especially at risk for elevated insulin responses and thus will likely suffer from performance-limiting transient hypoglycemia if they do not follow the correct regimen.
