= Brian McArdle =

British medical doctor and researcher

- Born: 9 April 1911; Balham, London, UK
- Died: 1 August 2002 (aged 91)
- Known for: Describing glycogen storage disease type V
- Scientific career
- Workplaces: Guy's Hospital

Brian McArdle (9 April 1911 – 1 August 2002) was a British medical doctor and researcher. He is known for first describing glycogen storage disease type V in his 1951 paper, while working at Guy's Hospital.

== Background ==
McArdle was born in Balham, London, to Andrew McArdle and Mary Frances Clare (née Woods). His father was the London-based parliamentary correspondent for The Scotsman newspaper. Although born in England, McArdle was of Irish extraction and belonged to a Roman Catholic family that maintained strong ties to their heritage; his older brother, the neurologist Michael John Francis McArdle, was widely known by the Irish name "Seán". Like his older brother, McArdle was educated at Wimbledon College before undergoing medical training at Guy's Hospital, the institution where he would later conduct his clinical research.

== Career ==
The paper, titled Myopathy due to a defect in muscle glycogen breakdown, described a 30-year-old man with a history of exertional muscle pain and stiffness – symptoms that previous doctors had dismissed as psychological – but which are now attributed to glycogen storage disease type V. Since then, the molecular and genetic basis of the disease has been identified. Besides the disease's scientific name, it is also named eponymously as McArdle's disease.
