= William McArdle =

American politician

Member of the Washington House of Representatives for the 39th district
- In office 1895–1897

Personal details
- Born: October 5, 1848 Ottawa, Canada West
- Died: March 17, 1908 (aged 59) Seattle, Washington, United States
- Party: Populist

William McArdle (October 5, 1848 – March 17, 1908) was a Canadian-American politician in the state of Washington. He served in the Washington House of Representatives from 1895 to 1897.
