= Myoglobinuria =

Presence of myoglobin in the urine

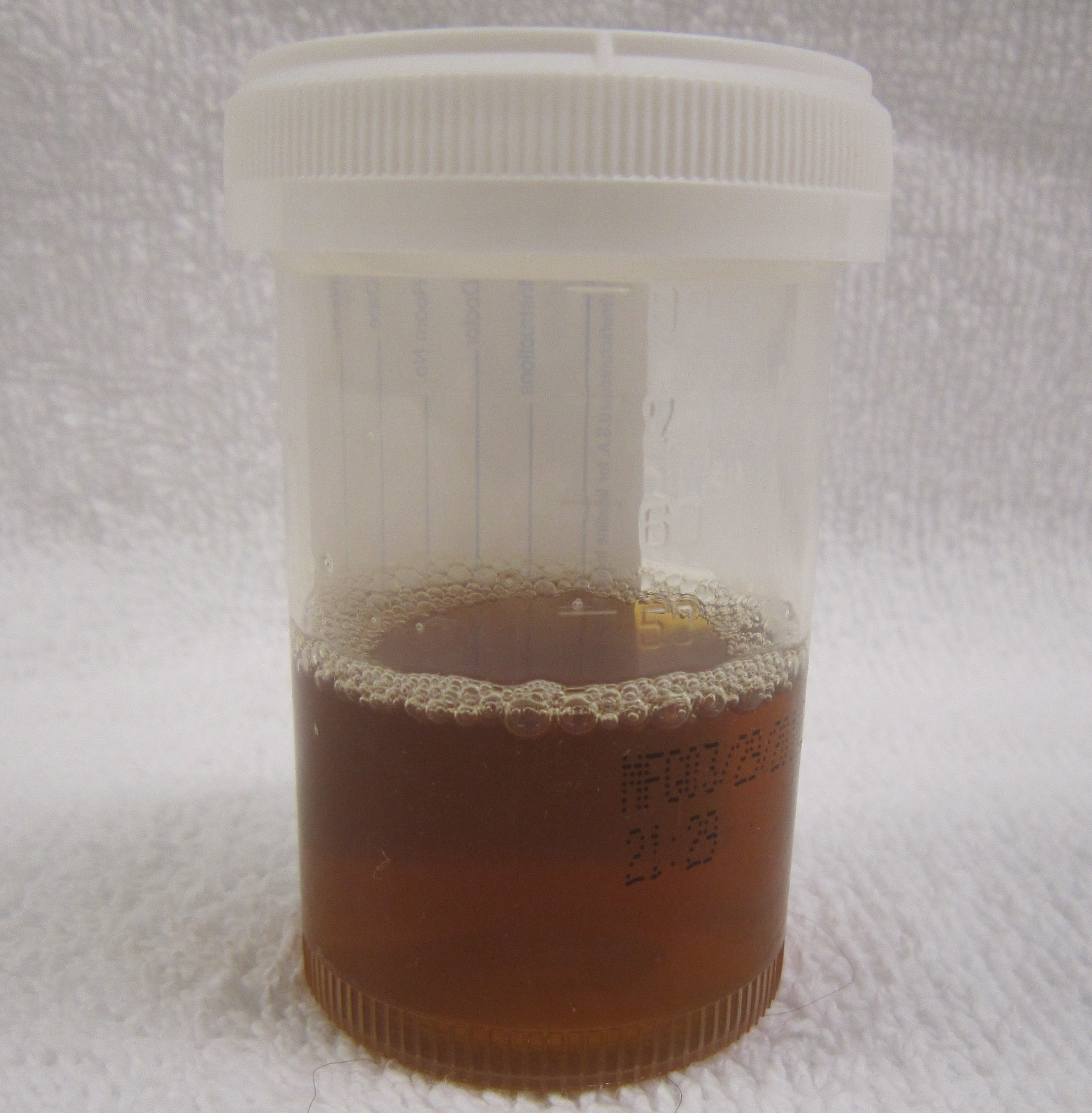
- Urine from a person with rhabdomyolysis showing the characteristic brown discoloration as a result of myoglobinuria
- Specialty: Nephrology

Myoglobinuria is the presence of myoglobin in the urine, which usually results from rhabdomyolysis or muscle injury. Myoglobin is present in muscle cells as a reserve of oxygen.

== Signs and symptoms ==
Signs and symptoms of myoglobinuria are usually nonspecific and needs some clinical prudence. Therefore, among the possible signs and symptoms to look for would be:

- Swollen and painful muscles
- Fever, nausea
- Delirium (elderly individuals)
- Myalgia
- Dark urine
- Calcium ion loss

== Causes ==
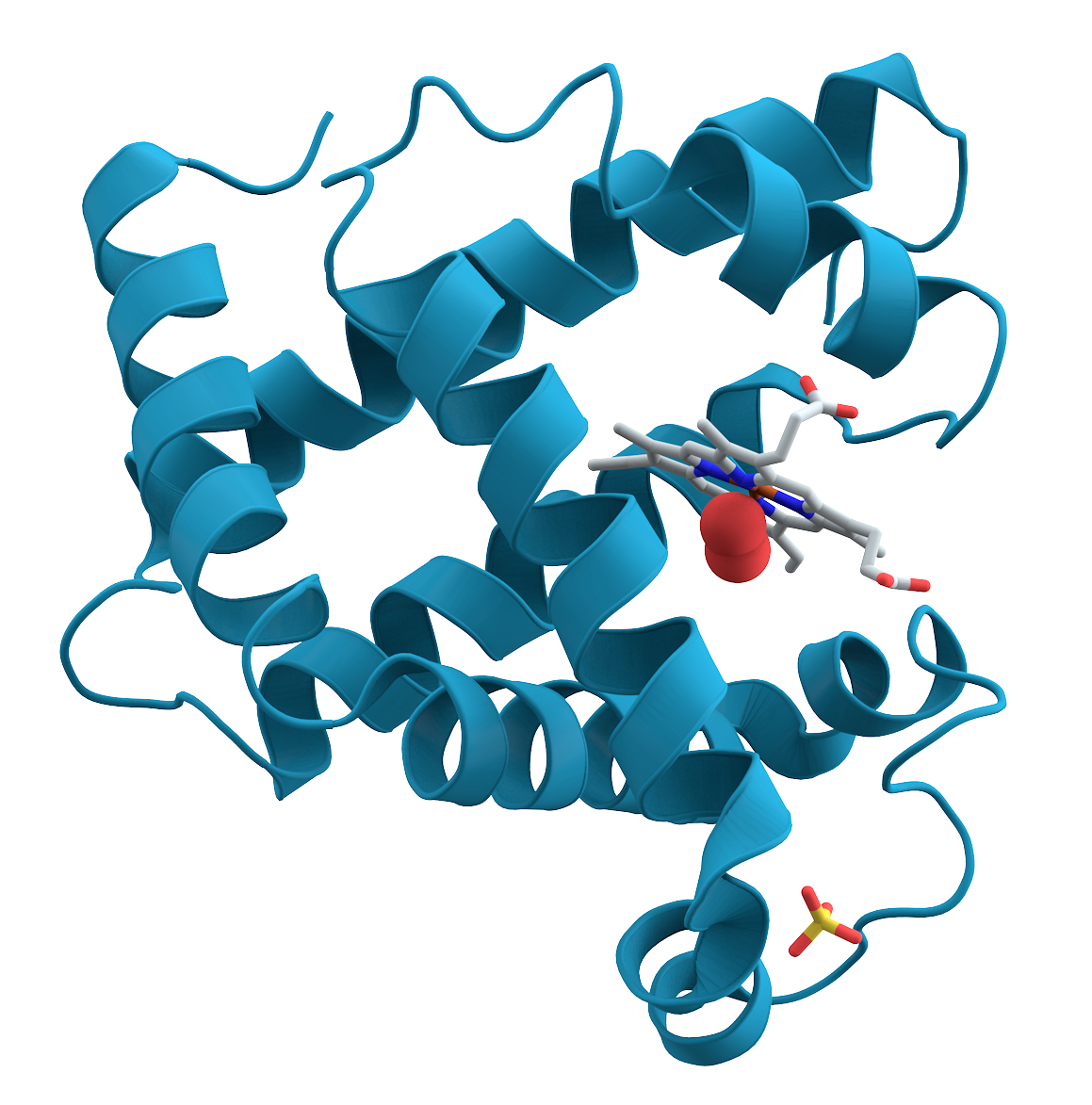
Model of helical domains in myoglobin.

Trauma, vascular problems, malignant hyperthermia, certain drugs and other situations can destroy or damage the muscle, releasing myoglobin to the circulation and thus to the kidneys. Under ideal situations myoglobin will be filtered and excreted with the urine, but if too much myoglobin is released into the circulation or in case of kidney problems, it can occlude the kidneys' filtration system leading to acute tubular necrosis and acute kidney injury.

Other causes of myoglobinuria include:

- McArdle's disease
- Phosphofructokinase deficiency
- Carnitine palmitoyltransferase II deficiency
- Malignant hyperthermia
- Polymyositis
- Lactate dehydrogenase deficiency
- Adenosine monophosphate deaminase deficiency type 1
- Thermal or electrical burn
- Muscular dystrophy

== Pathophysiology ==
Myoglobinuria pathophysiology consists of a series of metabolic actions in which damage to muscle cells affect calcium mechanisms, thereby increasing free ionized calcium in the cytoplasm of the myocytes (concurrently decreasing free ionized calcium in the bloodstream). This, in turn, affects several intracellular enzymes that are calcium-dependent, thereby compromising the cell membrane, which in turn causes the release of myoglobin.

== Diagnosis ==
After centrifuging, the urine of myoglobinuria is red, where the urine of hemoglobinuria after centrifuge is pink to clear.

== Treatment ==
Hospitalization and IV hydration should be the first step in any patient suspected of having myoglobinuria or rhabdomyolysis. The goal is to induce a brisk diuresis to prevent myoglobin precipitation and deposition, which can cause acute kidney injury. Mannitol can be added to assist with diuresis. Adding sodium bicarbonate to the IV fluids will cause alkalinization of the urine, believed to reduce the breakdown of myoglobin into its nephrotoxic metabolites, thus preventing renal damage. Often, IV normal saline is all that is needed to induce diuresis and alkalinize the urine.

== See also ==
- Pigmenturia
