= Protein catabolism =

Breakdown of proteins into constituent amino acids and compounds

In molecular biology, protein catabolism is the breakdown of proteins into smaller peptides and ultimately into amino acids. Protein catabolism is a key function of the digestion process. Protein catabolism often begins with pepsin, which converts proteins into polypeptides. These polypeptides are then further degraded. In humans, the pancreatic proteases include trypsin, chymotrypsin, and other enzymes. In the intestine, the small peptides are broken down into amino acids that can be absorbed into the bloodstream. These absorbed amino acids can then undergo amino acid catabolism, where they are utilized as an energy source or as precursors to new proteins.

The amino acids produced by catabolism may be directly recycled to form new proteins, converted into different amino acids, or can undergo amino acid catabolism to be converted to other compounds via the Krebs cycle.

== Interface with other metabolic and salvage pathways ==
Protein catabolism produces amino acids that are used to form other proteins or oxidized to meet the energy needs of the cell. The amino acids that are produced by protein catabolism can then be further catabolized in amino acid catabolism. Among the several degradative processes for amino acids are Deamination (removal of an amino group), transamination (transfer of amino group), decarboxylation (removal of carboxyl group), and dehydrogenation (removal of hydrogen). Degradation of amino acids can function as part of a salvage pathway, whereby parts of degraded amino acids are used to create new amino acids, or as part of a metabolic pathway whereby the amino acid is broken down to release or recapture chemical energy. For example, the chemical energy that is released by oxidization in a dehydrogenation reaction can be used to reduce NAD^{+} to NADH, which can then be fed directly into the Krebs/Citric Acid (TCA) Cycle.

== Protein degradation ==
Protein degradation differs from protein catabolism. Proteins are produced and destroyed routinely as part of the normal operations of the cell. Transcription factors, proteins that help regulate protein synthesis, are targets of such degradations. Their degradation is not a significant contributor to the energy needs of the cell. The addition of ubiquitin (ubiquitylation) marks a protein for degradation via the proteasome.

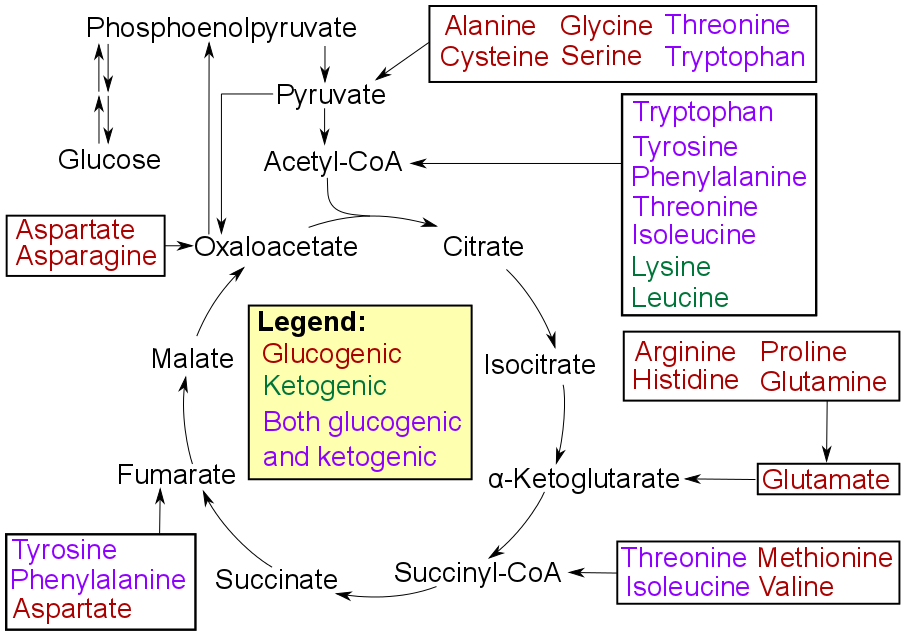
Amino Acids feeding into TCA Cycle

== Amino acid degradation ==
Oxidative deamination is the first step to breaking down the amino acids so that they can be converted to sugars. The process begins by removing the amino group of the amino acids. The amino group becomes ammonium as it is lost and later undergoes the urea cycle to become urea, in the liver. It is then released into the blood stream, where it is transferred to the kidneys, which will secrete the urea as urine. The remaining portion of the amino acid becomes oxidized, resulting in an α-keto acid. The alpha-keto acid will then proceed into the TCA cycle, in order to produce energy. The acid can also enter glycolysis, where it will be eventually converted into pyruvate. The pyruvate is then converted into acetyl-CoA so that it can enter the TCA cycle and convert the original pyruvate molecules into ATP, or usable energy for the organism.

Transamination leads to the same result as deamination: the remaining acid will undergo either glycolysis or the TCA cycle to produce energy that the organism's body will use for various purposes. This process transfers the amino group instead of losing the amino group to be converted into ammonium. The amino group is transferred to α-ketoglutarate, so that it can be converted to glutamate. Then glutamate transfers the amino group to oxaloacetate. This transfer is so that the oxaloacetate can be converted to aspartate or other amino acids. Eventually, this product will also proceed into oxidative deamination to once again produce alpha-ketoglutarate, an alpha-keto acid that will undergo the TCA cycle, and ammonium, which will eventually undergo the urea cycle.

Transaminases are enzymes that help catalyze the reactions that take place in transamination. They help catalyze the reaction at the point when the amino group is transferred from the original amino acid, like glutamate to α-ketoglutarate, and hold onto it to transfer it to another α-ketoacid.

== Factors determining protein half-life ==
Some key factors that determine overall rate include protein half-life, pH, and temperature.

Protein half-life helps determine the overall rate as this designates the first step in protein catabolism. Depending on whether this step is short or long will influence the rest of the metabolic process. One key component in determining the protein half-life is based on the N-end rule. This states that the amino acid present at the N-terminus of a protein helps determine the protein's half-life.

== See also ==
- Amino acid synthesis
- Anabolism
- Metabolism
- Proteolysis
