= Diagnosis of exclusion =

Medical diagnosis made by ruling out other conditions

A diagnosis of exclusion or by exclusion (per exclusionem) is a diagnosis of a medical condition reached by a process of elimination, which may be necessary if the presence of a condition cannot be established with complete confidence from history, examination or testing. Such elimination of other reasonable possibilities is a major component in performing a differential diagnosis (in medical shorthand, a DDx).

Diagnosis by exclusion tends to occur where scientific knowledge is scarce, specifically where the means to verify a diagnosis by an objective method is absent. It can also commonly occur where objective diagnostic tests do exist, but extensive diagnostic testing or sufficient exploration of differential diagnosis by a multidisciplinary team is not undertaken due to financial constraints or assessment bias.

The largest category of diagnosis by exclusion is psychiatric disorders, where the presence of physical or organic disease must be excluded as a prerequisite for making a functional diagnosis.

== Examples ==
An example of a diagnosis subject to differential diagnosis (diagnosis by exclusion) is "fever of unknown etiology". To explain the cause (etiology) of the elevated temperature, the most common causes of unexplained fever (infection, neoplasm, or collagen vascular disease) must be ruled out.

Other examples include:

- Fibromyalgia
- Adult-onset Still's disease
- Behçet's disease
- Bell's palsy
- Burning mouth syndrome
- Chronic recurrent multifocal osteomyelitis
- Long COVID
- Inappropriate sinus tachycardia
- Psychogenic polydipsia
- Schizophrenia
- Somatic symptom disorder
- Sudden infant death syndrome
- Thoracic outlet syndrome
- Tolosa–Hunt syndrome
- Systemic-onset juvenile idiopathic arthritis

== See also ==
- Etiology (medicine)
- Idiopathic disease
- Wastebasket diagnosis
