= Glucose phosphomutase =

Glucose phosphomutase may refer to:

- Phosphoglucomutase (glucose-cofactor), an enzyme
- Phosphoglucomutase, an enzyme
