= Glycogenesis =

Polymerisation of glucose molecules into glycogen

Glycogenesis is the process of glycogen synthesis or the process of converting glucose into glycogen in which glucose molecules are added to chains of glycogen for storage. This process is activated during rest periods following the Cori cycle, in the liver, and also activated by insulin in response to high glucose levels.

== Steps ==
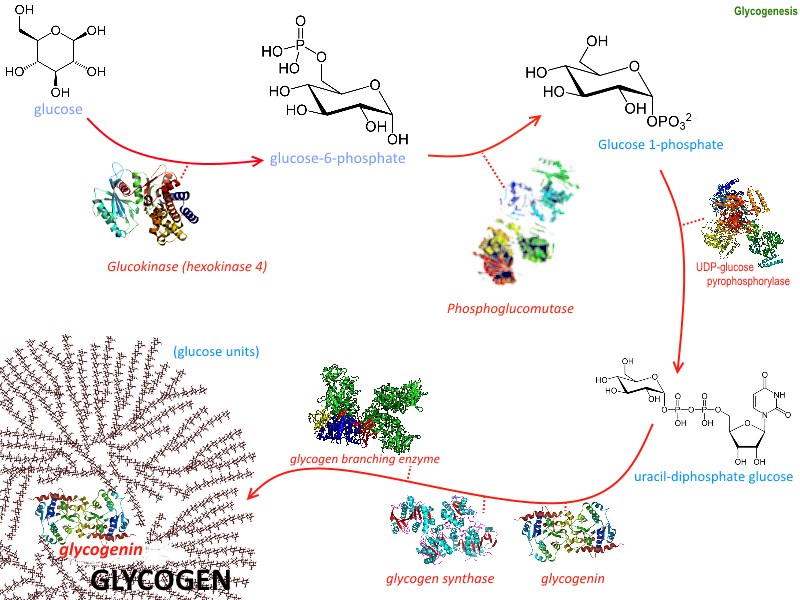

- Glucose is converted into glucose 6-phosphate by the action of glucokinase or hexokinase with conversion of ATP to ADP.
- Glucose-6-phosphate is converted into glucose-1-phosphate by the action of phosphoglucomutase, passing through the obligatory intermediate glucose-1,6-bisphosphate.
- Glucose-1-phosphate is converted into UDP-glucose by the action of the enzyme UDP-glucose pyrophosphorylase. Pyrophosphate is formed, which is later hydrolysed by pyrophosphatase into two phosphate molecules.
- The enzyme glycogenin is needed to create initial short glycogen chains, which are then lengthened and branched by the other enzymes of glycogenesis. Glycogenin, a homodimer, has a tyrosine residue on each subunit that serves as the anchor for the reducing end of glycogen. Initially, about seven UDP-glucose molecules are added to each tyrosine residue by glycogenin, forming α(1→4) bonds.
- Once a chain of seven glucose monomers is formed, glycogen synthase binds to the growing glycogen chain and adds UDP-glucose to the 4-hydroxyl group of the glucosyl residue on the non-reducing end of the glycogen chain, forming more α(1→4) bonds in the process.
- Branches are made by glycogen branching enzyme (also known as amylo-α(1:4)→α(1:6)transglycosylase), which transfers the end of the chain onto an earlier part via α-1:6 glycosidic bond, forming branches, which further grow by addition of more α-1:4 glycosidic units.

Metabolism of common monosaccharides, including glycolysis, gluconeogenesis, glycogenesis and glycogenolysis

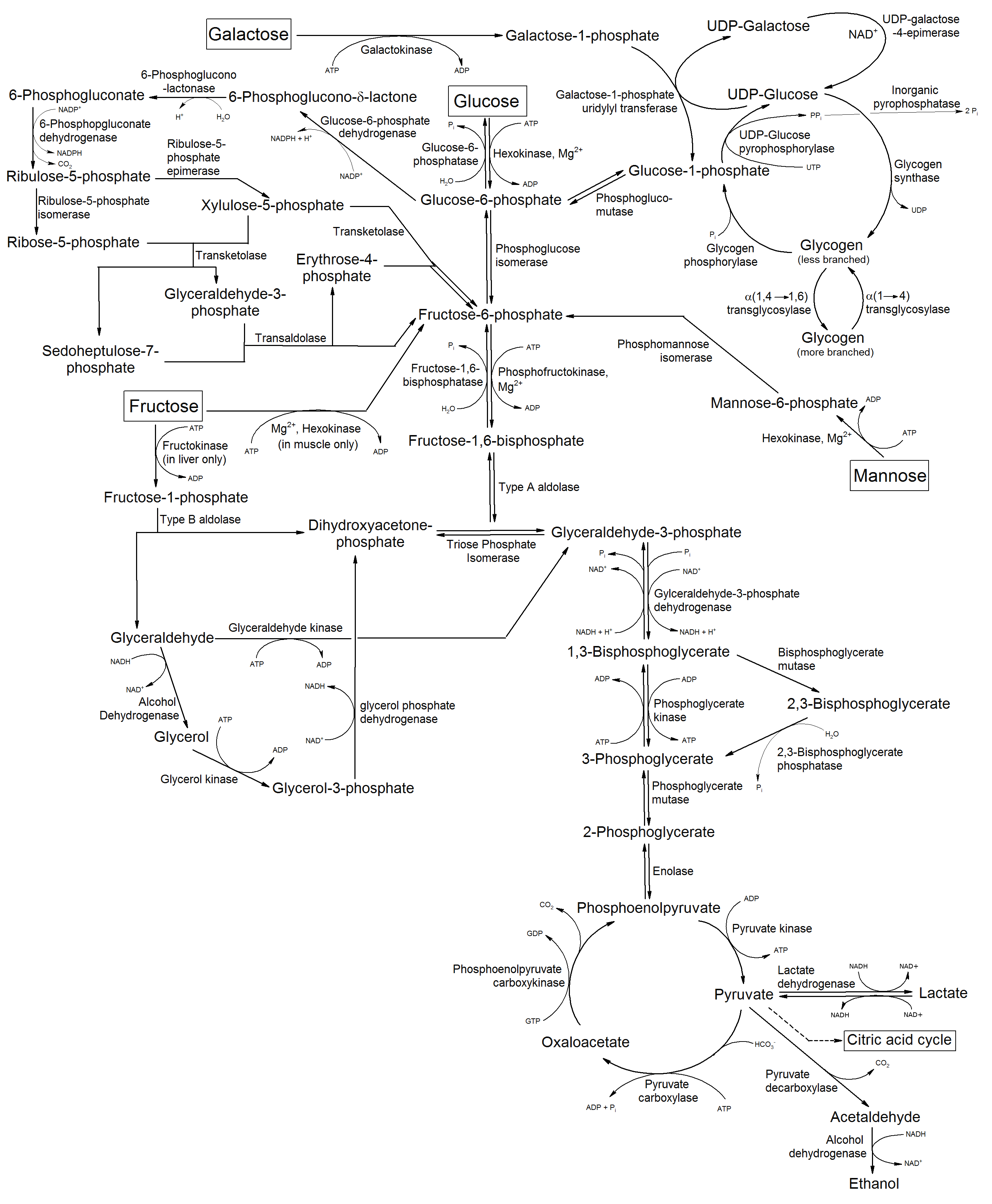

== Control and regulations ==
Glycogenesis responds to hormonal control.

One of the main forms of control is the varied phosphorylation of glycogen synthase and glycogen phosphorylase. This is regulated by enzymes under the control of hormonal activity, which is in turn regulated by many factors. As such, there are many different possible effectors when compared to allosteric systems of regulation.

=== Epinephrine (adrenaline) ===
Glycogen phosphorylase is activated by phosphorylation, whereas glycogen synthase is inhibited.

Glycogen phosphorylase is converted from its less active "b" form to an active "a" form by the enzyme phosphorylase kinase. This latter enzyme is itself activated by protein kinase A and deactivated by phosphoprotein phosphatase-1.

Protein kinase A itself is activated by the hormone adrenaline. Epinephrine binds to a receptor protein that activates adenylate cyclase. The latter enzyme causes the formation of cyclic AMP from ATP; two molecules of cyclic AMP bind to the regulatory subunit of protein kinase A, which activates it allowing the catalytic subunit of protein kinase A to dissociate from the assembly and to phosphorylate other proteins.

Returning to glycogen phosphorylase, the less active "b" form can itself be activated without the conformational change. 5'AMP acts as an allosteric activator, whereas ATP is an inhibitor, as already seen with phosphofructokinase control, helping to change the rate of flux in response to energy demand.

Epinephrine not only activates glycogen phosphorylase but also inhibits glycogen synthase. This amplifies the effect of activating glycogen phosphorylase. This inhibition is achieved by a similar mechanism, as protein kinase A acts to phosphorylate the enzyme, which lowers activity. This is known as co-ordinate reciprocal control. Refer to glycolysis for further information of the regulation of glycogenesis.

=== Calcium ions ===
Calcium ions or cyclic AMP (cAMP) act as secondary messengers. This is an example of negative control. The calcium ions activate phosphorylase kinase. This activates glycogen phosphorylase and inhibits glycogen synthase.

== See also ==
- Glycogenolysis
- Glycogen synthase
- Glycogen storage disease
