= Mitochondrial pyruvate carrier 1 =

Protein-coding gene in the species Homo sapiens

MPC1

Identifiers
- Aliases: MPC1, BRP44L, MPYCD, dJ68L15.3, CGI-129, mitochondrial pyruvate carrier 1, SLC54A1
- External IDs: OMIM: 614738; MGI: 1915240; GeneCards: MPC1

Gene location (Human)
Chr.	Chromosome 6 (human)
Band	6q27	Start	166,364,919 bp
Band	6q27	End	166,383,013 bp

Gene location (Mouse)
Chr.	Chromosome 17 (mouse)
Band	17 A1|17 4.92 cM	Start	8,501,736 bp
Band	17 A1|17 4.92 cM	End	8,516,493 bp
RNA expression pattern
Bgee	Human / Mouse (ortholog); Top expressed in: right ventricle; left ventricle; right auricle of heart; apex of heart; C1 segment; right lobe of liver; muscle of thigh; human kidney; parotid gland; myocardium / Top expressed in: proximal tubule; right kidney; quadriceps femoris muscle; white adipose tissue; muscle of thigh; muscle tissue; skeletal muscle tissue; human kidney; cerebellar cortex; heart; More reference expression data
BioGPS	n/a
Gene ontology
Molecular function	pyruvate transmembrane transporter activity; molecular function
Cellular component	integral component of membrane; mitochondrial inner membrane; membrane; mitochondrion; integral component of mitochondrial inner membrane; cellular component
Biological process	mitochondrial acetyl-CoA biosynthetic process from pyruvate; mitochondrial pyruvate transmembrane transport; cellular response to leukemia inhibitory factor; biological process
Sources:Amigo / QuickGO
Orthologs
Databases	NCBI: entry; OMA: entry
Species	Human	Mouse
Entrez	51660	55951
Ensembl	ENSG00000060762	ENSMUSG00000023861
UniProt	Q9Y5U8	P63030
RefSeq (mRNA)	NM_001270879; NM_016098	NM_018819; NM_001364918; NM_001364919
RefSeq (protein)	NP_001257808; NP_057182; NP_001363494; NP_001363495; NP_001363496 NP_001363497; NP_001363498	NP_061289; NP_001351847; NP_001351848
Location (UCSC)	Chr 6: 166.36 – 166.38 Mb	Chr 17: 8.5 – 8.52 Mb
PubMed search
- Wikidata
View/Edit Human	View/Edit Mouse

Mitochondrial pyruvate carrier 1 (MPC1), also known as brain protein 44-like (BRP44L) and SLC54A1, is a protein that in humans is encoded by the MPC1 gene. It is part of the mitochondrial pyruvate carrier (MPC) protein family. This protein is involved in transport of pyruvate across the inner membrane of mitochondria in preparation for the pyruvate dehydrogenase reaction.

== Interactive pathway map ==
Click on genes, proteins and metabolites below to link to respective articles. (Note: The interactive pathway map can be edited at WikiPathways: "GlycolysisGluconeogenesis_WP534".)

Glycolysis and Gluconeogenesis edit

== Clinical significance ==
Mitochondrial pyruvate carrier deficiency (MPYCD) is an autosomal recessive disease due to mutations in the MPC1 gene on chromosome 6q27. It is an inborn error of carbohydrate metabolism that blocks aerobic glycolysis by preventing the transport of pyruvate from the cytosol into the mitochondrion for oxidative phosphorylation; however, anaerobic glycolysis is preserved. Common signs and symptoms include poor growth, normal lactate/pyruvate ratio (however both lactate and pyruvate are in higher than normal concentrations), hepatomegaly, lactic acidosis, hypoglycemia, neurological problems, and hypotonia. A disease with comparable symptoms is also seen in autosomal recessive mutations of the MPC2 gene.

== See also ==
- Mitochondrial pyruvate carrier 2
- Inborn errors of carbohydrate metabolism
