= Mitochondrial pyruvate carrier 2 =

Protein found in humans

MPC2

Identifiers
- Aliases: MPC2, BRP44, mitochondrial pyruvate carrier 2, SLC54A2
- External IDs: OMIM: 614737; MGI: 1917706; GeneCards: MPC2

Gene location (Human)
Chr.	Chromosome 1 (human)
Band	1q24.2	Start	167,916,675 bp
Band	1q24.2	End	167,937,072 bp

Gene location (Mouse)
Chr.	Chromosome 1 (mouse)
Band	1|1 H2.3	Start	165,288,206 bp
Band	1|1 H2.3	End	165,308,783 bp
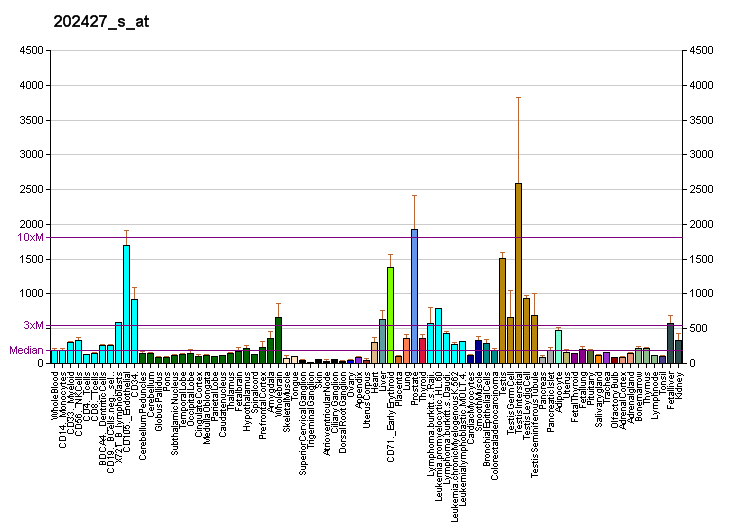
RNA expression pattern
Bgee	Human / Mouse (ortholog); Top expressed in: sperm; thoracic diaphragm; left testis; right testis; right ventricle; renal medulla; mucosa of sigmoid colon; Skeletal muscle tissue of rectus abdominis; myocardium of left ventricle; liver / Top expressed in: cardiac muscle tissue of left ventricle; masseter muscle; interventricular septum; atrioventricular valve; seminiferous tubule; extensor digitorum longus muscle; digastric muscle; right kidney; tunica adventitia of aorta; thoracic diaphragm; More reference expression data
BioGPS	More reference expression data
Gene ontology
Molecular function	pyruvate transmembrane transporter activity
Cellular component	integral component of membrane; mitochondrial inner membrane; membrane; mitochondrion; nucleus; integral component of mitochondrial inner membrane
Biological process	mitochondrial acetyl-CoA biosynthetic process from pyruvate; positive regulation of insulin secretion involved in cellular response to glucose stimulus; mitochondrial pyruvate transmembrane transport; transport
Sources:Amigo / QuickGO
Orthologs
Databases	NCBI: entry; OMA: entry
Species	Human	Mouse
Entrez	25874	70456
Ensembl	ENSG00000143158	ENSMUSG00000026568
UniProt	O95563; Q5R3B4	Q9D023
RefSeq (mRNA)	NM_001143674; NM_015415	NM_027430
RefSeq (protein)	NP_001137146; NP_056230	NP_081706
Location (UCSC)	Chr 1: 167.92 – 167.94 Mb	Chr 1: 165.29 – 165.31 Mb
PubMed search
- Wikidata
View/Edit Human	View/Edit Mouse

Mitochondrial pyruvate carrier 2 (MPC2) also known as brain protein 44 (BRP44) is a protein that in humans is encoded by the MPC2 gene. It is a member of the Mitochondrial Pyruvate Carrier (MPC) protein family. This protein is involved in transport of pyruvate across the inner membrane of mitochondria in preparation for the pyruvate dehydrogenase reaction.

== Interactive pathway map ==
Click on genes, proteins and metabolites below to link to respective articles. (Note: The interactive pathway map can be edited at WikiPathways: "GlycolysisGluconeogenesis_WP534".)

Glycolysis and Gluconeogenesis edit

== Clinical significance ==
Mutations in the MPC2 gene cause an autosomal recessive disease comparable to the symptoms of Mitochondrial pyruvate carrier deficiency (MPC1 gene). The symptoms associated with mutations in the MPC2 gene include early-onset neurological problems, normal lactate/pyruvate ratio (however both lactate and pyruvate are in higher than normal concentrations), lactic acidosis, hypotonia, cardiomegaly, and facial dysmorphia.

== See also ==
- Mitochondrial pyruvate carrier 1 (MPC1)
- Inborn errors of carbohydrate metabolism
