= UTP—glucose-1-phosphate uridylyltransferase =

Class of enzymes

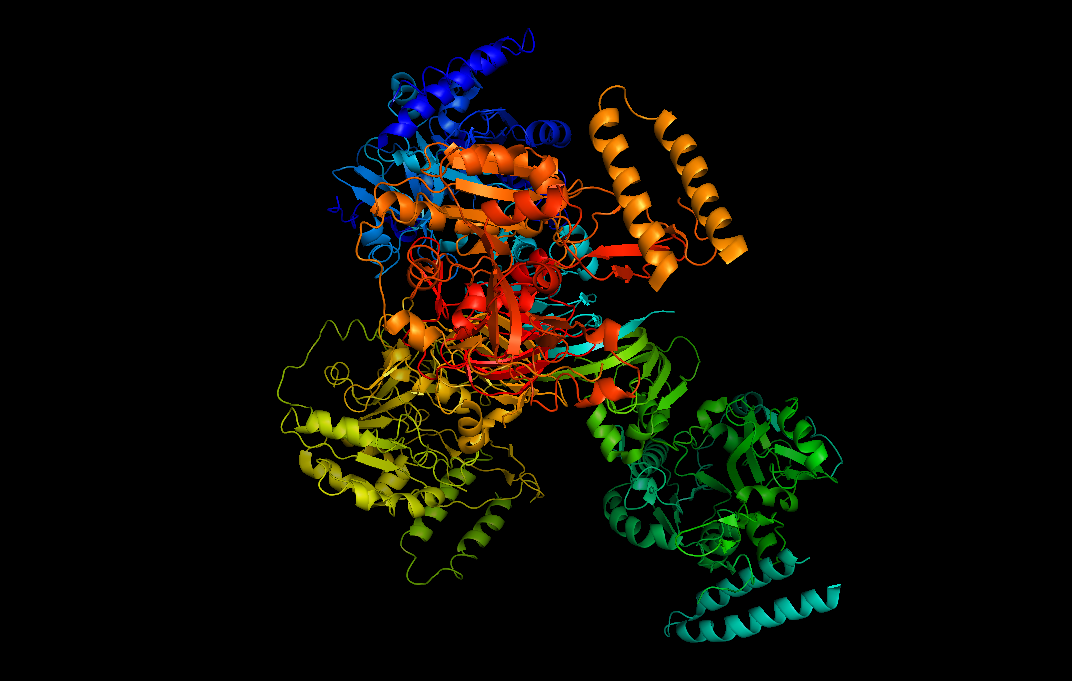
- Human UTP—glucose-1-phosphate uridylyltransferase cartoon created in pymol

Identifiers
- EC no.: 2.7.7.9
- CAS no.: 9026-22-6

Databases
- BRENDA: enzyme data
- ExPASy: NiceZyme view
- KEGG: enzyme entry
- MetaCyc: metabolic pathway
- Rhea: reactions
- PDB structures: RCSB PDB PDBe PDBsum
- Gene Ontology: AmiGO / QuickGO
Search
- PMC: articles
- PubMed: articles
- NCBI: proteins

UTP—glucose-1-phosphate uridylyltransferase also known as glucose-1-phosphate uridylyltransferase (or UDP–glucose pyrophosphorylase) is an enzyme involved in carbohydrate metabolism. It synthesizes uridine diphosphate glucose from uridine triphosphate and glucose-1-phosphate:

uridine triphosphate
+
glucose 1-phosphate
PP_{i}
uridine diphosphate glucose

UTP—glucose-1-phosphate uridylyltransferase is an enzyme found in all three domains (bacteria, eukarya, and archaea); it is important for glycogenesis and cell wall synthesis. Its role in sugar metabolism has been studied extensively in plants in order to understand plant growth and increase agricultural production. Human UTP—glucose-1-phosphate uridylyltransferase has been studied and crystallized, revealing a different type of regulation than other organisms previously studied. Its significance is derived from the many uses of UDP-glucose including galactose metabolism, glycogen synthesis, glycoprotein synthesis, and glycolipid synthesis.

== Structure ==
The structure of UTP—glucose-1-phosphate uridylyltransferase is significantly different between prokaryotes and eukaryotes, but within eukaryotes, the primary, secondary, and tertiary structures of the enzyme are quite conserved. In many species, UTP—glucose-1-phosphate uridylyltransferase is found as a homopolymer consisting of identical subunits in a symmetrical quaternary structure. The number of subunits varies across species: for instance, in Escherichia coli, the enzyme is found as a tetramer, whereas in Burkholderia xenovorans, the enzyme is dimeric. In humans and in yeast, the enzyme is active as an octamer consisting of two tetramers stacked onto one another with conserved hydrophobic residues at the interfaces between the subunits. In contrast, the enzyme in plants has conserved charged residues forming the interface between subunits.

In humans, each enzyme subunit contains several residues (L113, N251, and N328) that are highly conserved in eukaryotes. A Rossman fold motif participates in binding of the UTP nucleotide and a sugar-binding domain (residues T286–G293) coordinates with the glucose ring. A missense mutation (G115D) in the region of the enzyme containing the active site (which is conserved in eukaryotes) causes a dramatic decrease in enzymatic activity in vitro.

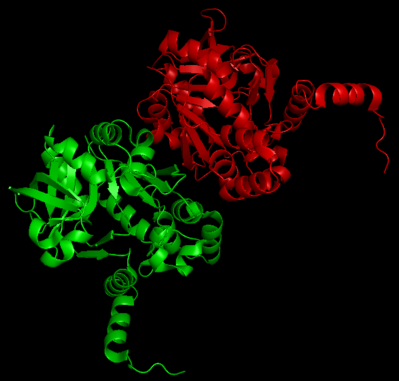
Crystal structure of UTP—glucose-1-phosphate uridylyltransferase from Burkholderia xenovorans

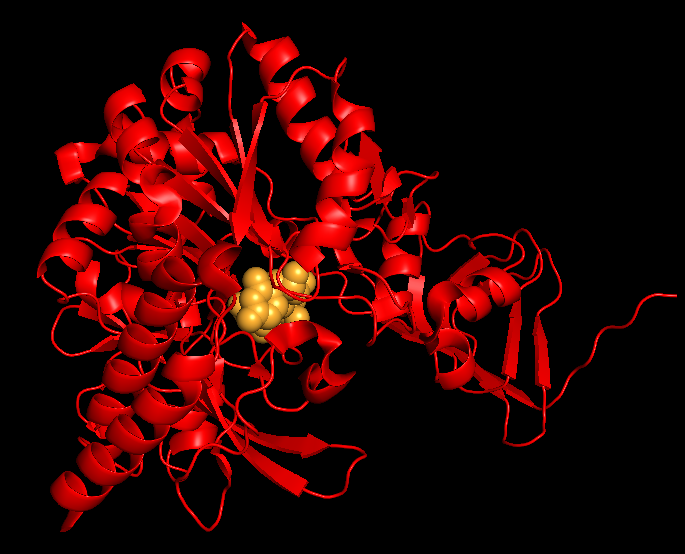
Human UTP—glucose-1-phosphate uridylyltransferase isoform 1 subunit with UDP-glucose bound

== Examples ==
Human genes encoding proteins with UTP—glucose-1-phosphate uridylyltransferase activity include two isoforms with molecular weights of 56.9 and 55.7 kDa, respectively.

UDP–glucose pyrophosphorylase 1
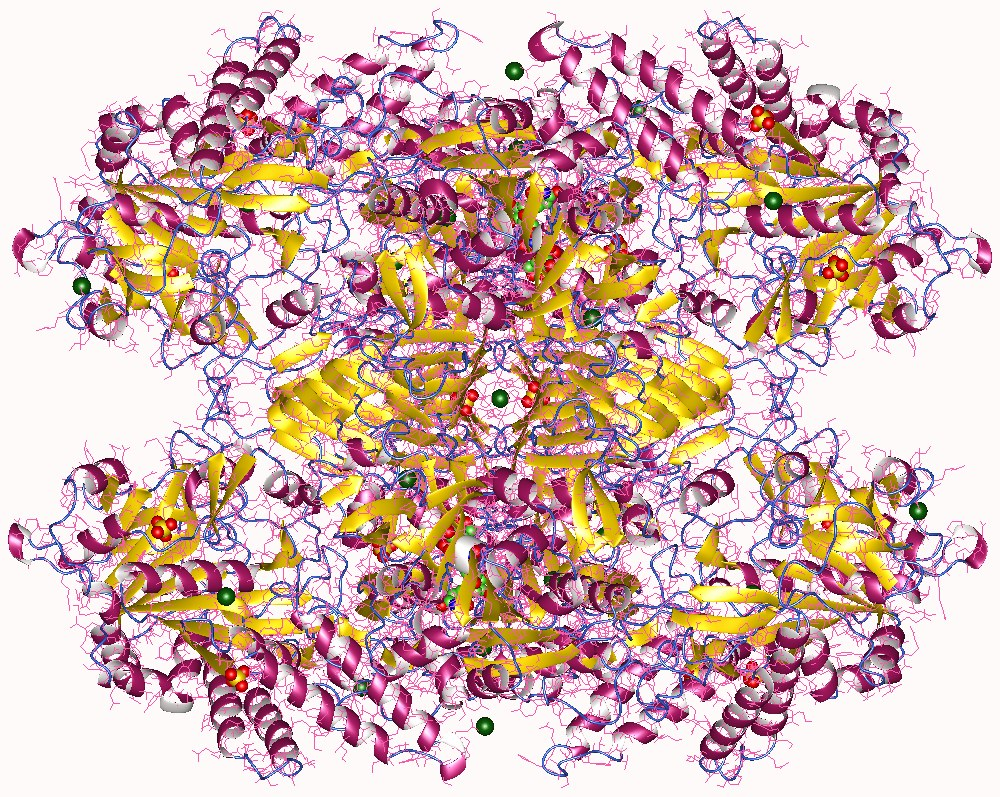
- UDP-glucose pyrophosphorylase 1, homooctamer, Human

Identifiers
- Symbol: UGP1
- NCBI gene: 7359
- HGNC: 12526
- OMIM: 191750

Other data
- EC number: 2.7.7.9
- Locus: Chr. 1 q21-q22

UDP–glucose pyrophosphorylase 2

Identifiers
- Symbol: UGP2
- NCBI gene: 7360
- HGNC: 12527
- OMIM: 191760
- RefSeq: NM_006759
- UniProt: Q16851

Other data
- EC number: 2.7.7.9
- Locus: Chr. 2 p14-p13
Search for
- Structures: Swiss-model
- Domains: InterPro

== Function ==
UTP—glucose-1-phosphate uridylyltransferase is ubiquitous in nature due to its important role in the generation of UDP-glucose, a central compound in carbohydrate metabolism. In plant leaves, UTP—glucose-1-phosphate uridylyltransferase is a key part of the sucrose biosynthesis pathway, supplying Uridine diphosphate glucose to Sucrose-phosphate synthase which converts UDP-glucose and D-fructose 6-phosphate into sucrose-6-phosphate. It may also be partially responsible for the breakdown of sucrose in other tissues using UDP-glucose.

In higher animals, the enzyme is highly active in tissues involved in glycogenesis, including the liver and the muscles. An exception is the brain, which has high levels of glycogen but low specific activity of UTP—glucose-1-phosphate uridylyltransferase. In animal cells, UTP—glucose-1-phosphate uridylyltransferase is found predominantly in the cytoplasm.

UTP—glucose-1-phosphate uridylyltransferase is also required for galactose metabolism in animals and microorganisms. In galactose metabolism, the enzyme galactose 1-phosphate uridylyltransferase transfers a phosphate from UDP-glucose to galactose 1-phosphate to produce UDP-galactose, which is then converted to UDP-glucose. Bacteria with defective UTP—glucose-1-phosphate uridylyltransferase are unable to incorporate galactose into their cell walls.

== Mechanism ==
In this enzyme's primary reaction, the phosphate group on glucose-1-phosphate replaces the phosphoanhydride bond on UTP. This reaction is readily reversible and the Gibbs Free Energy is close to zero. However, under typical cellular conditions, inorganic pyrophosphatase quickly hydrolyzes the pyrophosphate product and drives the reaction forward by Le Chatelier's Principle.

UTP—glucose-1-phosphate uridylyltransferase uses an ordered sequential Bi Bi mechanism for both the forward and reverse reactions. In yeast, the enzyme follows simple Michaelis-Menten kinetics and does not exhibit cooperativity between the subunits in the octamer.

Similar to other sugar nucleotidyltransferases, UTP—glucose-1-phosphate uridylyltransferase activity requires two divalent cations to stabilize the binding of negatively charged phosphate groups. Magnesium typically serves in this role, but other ions such as manganese(II), cobalt(II), and nickel(II) can also substitute with a ~75% reduction in the optimal activity. X-ray crystallography experiments have shown that one Mg^{2+} ion is coordinated by a phosphoryl oxygen on glucose 1-phosphate and by an α-phosphoryl oxygen on UTP. In addition to stabilizing the negatively charged phosphates, Mg^{2+} is thought to orient the glucose 1-phosphate for nucleophilic attack of the α-phosphorus of UTP.

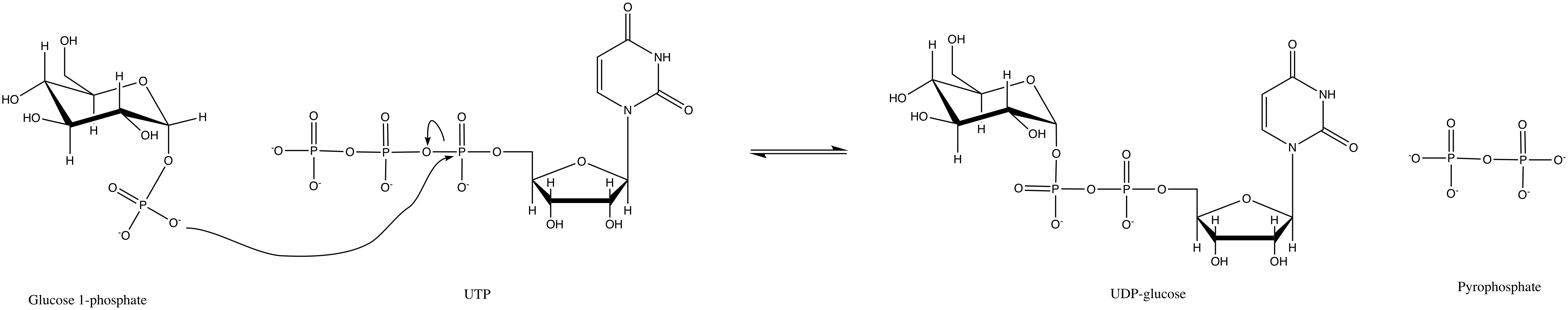
UTP—glucose-1-phosphate uridylyltransferase reaction mechanism

== Regulation ==
Although functionally similar across species, UDP-glucose pyrophosphorylase has different structures and regulation mechanisms in different organisms.

=== Microorganisms ===
In yeast, UTP—glucose-1-phosphate uridylyltransferase is regulated by phosphorylation by PAS kinase. This phosphorylation is reversible and controls the partition of sugar flux towards glycogen and cell wall synthesis.

=== Plants ===
UTP—glucose-1-phosphate uridylyltransferase in plants is regulated through oligomerization and possibly phosphorylation. In barley, it has been shown that UDP-glucose pyrophosphorylase is only active in monomeric form but readily forms oligomers, suggesting that oligomerization may be a form of regulation of the enzyme. In rice, cold stress decreases N-glycosylation of the enzyme, which is thought to alter the enzyme's activity in response to cold.

In Arabidopsis, there are two isozymes of UTP—glucose-1-phosphate uridylyltransferase: UGP1 and UGP2. These two isozymes have almost identical activities and differ in only 32 amino acids, all of which are located on the outer surface of the protein away from the active site. These minor differences may allow for differential allosteric regulation of isozyme activity. UGP1 and UGP2 are differentially expressed in different parts of the plant. UGP1 expression is widely expressed in the majority of tissues while UGP2 is expressed primarily in flowers, suggesting that UGP1 is the major form of the enzyme and UGP2 serves an auxiliary function. Indeed, UGP2 expression is increased in response to stressors such as phosphate deficiency, indicating that UGP2 probably functions as a backup to UGP1 when the plant is under environmental stress.

=== Animals ===
The control of UTP—glucose-1-phosphate uridylyltransferase activity is primarily achieved by genetic means (i.e. regulation of transcription and translation). Similar to most enzymes, UTP—glucose-1-phosphate uridylyltransferase is inhibited by its product, UDP-glucose. However, the enzyme is not subject to significant allosteric regulation, which is logical given the widespread use of UDP-glucose in a variety of metabolic pathways.

=== Humans ===
In humans, UDP-glucose pyrophosphorylase is active as an octamer. The enzyme's activity is also modified by O-glycosylation. Similar to other mamallian species, there two different isoforms in humans that are produced by alternative splicing of the gene. The isoforms differ by only 11 amino acids at the N-terminus and no significant differences in their functional activity have been identified.

== Disease relevance ==
In humans, galactosemia is a disorder that affects the development of newborns and children as they cannot metabolize the sugar galactose properly. It is speculated that overexpression of UDP-glucose pyrophosphorylase may relieve symptoms in humans with galactosemia.

In cancer cells, which typically have high rates of glycolysis and decreased glycogen content, the activity of UTP—glucose-1-phosphate uridylyltransferase is often downregulated by up to 50-60% compared to normal cells. The abnormally low activity of UTP—glucose-1-phosphate uridylyltransferase is due to decreased levels of the enzyme and the downregulation of other enzymes in the glycogenic pathway including glycogen synthase and phosphoglucomutase.

UTP—glucose-1-phosphate uridylyltransferase has been found to be an important virulence factor in a variety of pathogens including bacteria and protozoa. For example, the enzyme has been found to be required for the biosynthesis of capsular polysaccharide, an important virulence factor of Streptococcus pneumoniae, a bacterial cause of pneumonia, bronchitis, and other breathing issues. As a result, the enzyme has attracted attention as a potential target for pharmaceuticals. However, in order to achieve specificity, the drugs must be designed to specifically target allosteric sites on the surface of the protein because the active site is highly conserved across species.

UDP-glucose pyrophosphorylase (UGP2) was recently found to be implicated in novel neurodevelopmental disorder in humans, also referred to as Barakat-Perenthaler syndrome. This disorder was first described in 22 individuals from 15 families, presenting with a severe epileptic encephalopathy, neurodevelopmental delay with absence of virtually all developmental milestones, intractable seizures, progressive microcephaly, visual disturbance and similar minor dysmorphisms. Barakat and colleagues identified a recurrent homozygous mutation in all affected individuals (chr2:64083454A > G), which mutates the translational start site of the shorter protein isoform of UGP2. Therefore, the shorter protein isoform can no longer be produced in patients harboring the homozygous mutation. Functional studies from the same group showed that the short protein isoform is normally predominantly expressed in human brain. Therefore, the recurrent mutation leads to a tissue-specific absence of UGP2 in brain, which leads to altered glycogen metabolism, upregulated unfolded protein response and premature neuronal differentiation. Other bi-allelic loss-of-function mutations in UGP2 are likely lethal, as human embryonic stem cells depleted of both short and long isoforms of UGP2 fail to differentiate in cardiomyocytes and blood cells. Hence, the identification of this new disease also shows that isoform-specific start-loss mutations causing expression loss of a tissue-relevant isoform of an essential protein can cause a genetic disease, even when an organism-wide protein absence is incompatible with life. A therapy for Barakat-Perenthaler syndrome does currently not exist.
