= PGK1 =

Protein-coding gene in the species Homo sapiens

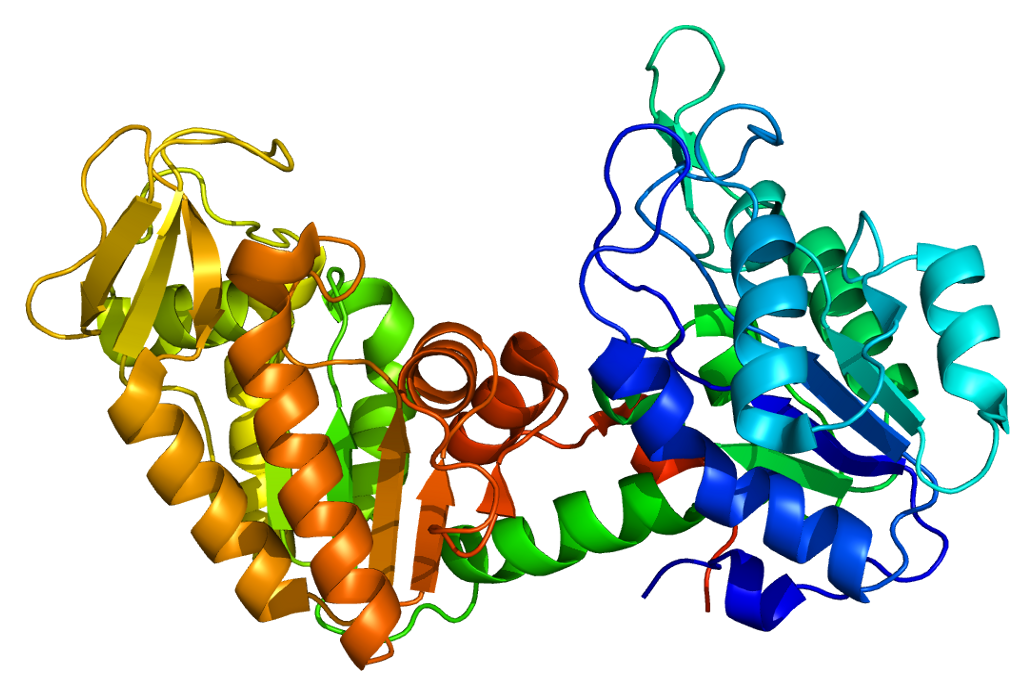
Available structures
PDB	Ortholog search: PDBe RCSB
PDB	List of PDB id codes 2WZB, 2WZC, 2WZD, 2X13, 2X14, 2X15, 2XE6, 2XE7, 2XE8, 2Y3I, 2YBE, 2ZGV, 3C39, 3C3A, 3C3B, 3C3C, 3ZOZ, 4AXX, 4O33

Identifiers
- Aliases: PGK1, HEL-S-68p, MIG10, PGKA, phosphoglycerate kinase 1
- External IDs: OMIM: 311800; MGI: 97555; HomoloGene: 21542; GeneCards: PGK1; OMA:PGK1 - orthologs

Gene location (Human)
Chr.	X chromosome (human)
Band	Xq21.1	Start	77,910,739 bp
Band	Xq21.1	End	78,129,295 bp

Gene location (Mouse)
Chr.	X chromosome (mouse)
Band	X D|X 47.36 cM	Start	105,230,706 bp
Band	X D|X 47.36 cM	End	105,247,305 bp
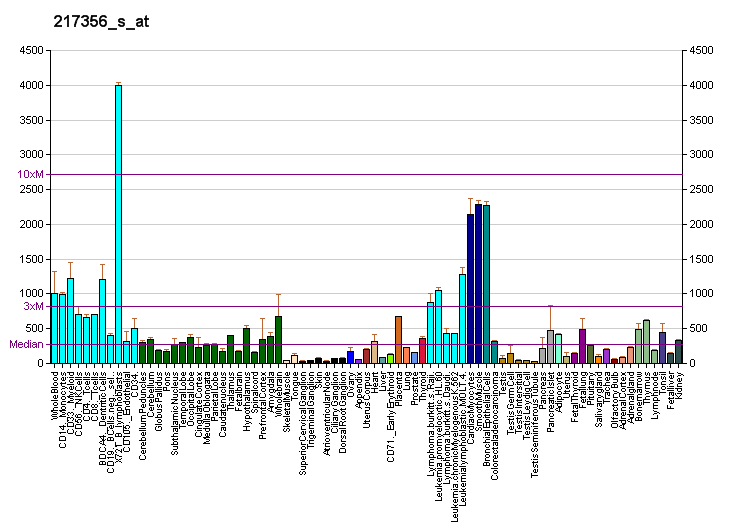

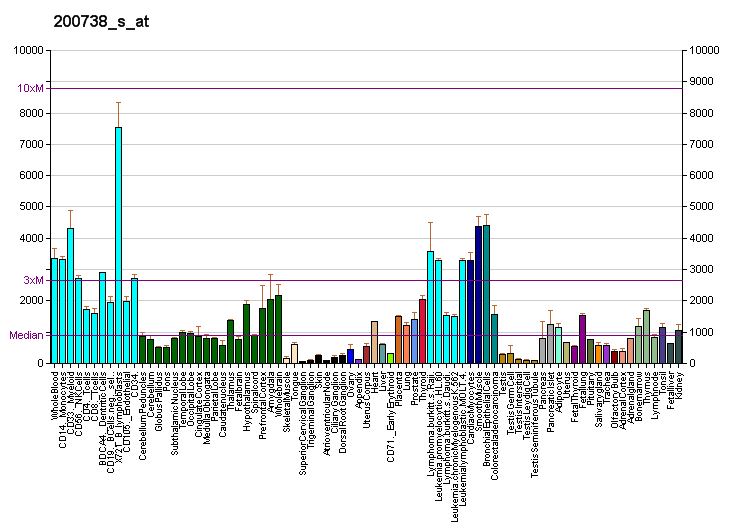

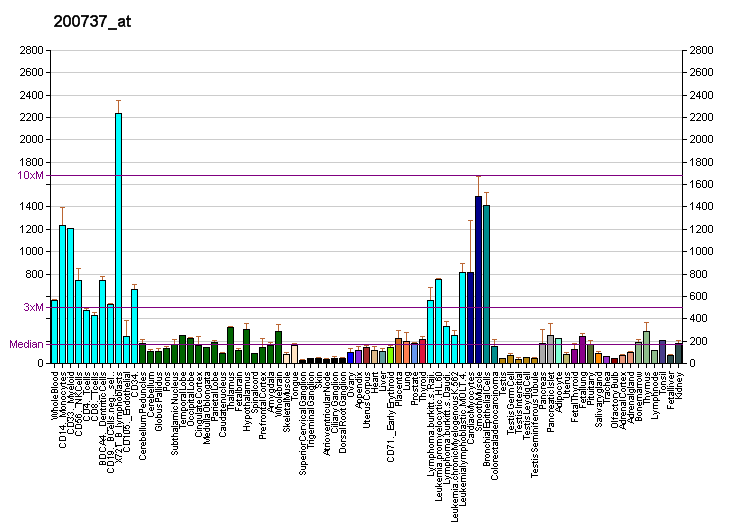
RNA expression pattern
Bgee	Human / Mouse (ortholog); Top expressed in: tibia; germinal epithelium; right ventricle; pericardium; parotid gland; Skeletal muscle tissue of rectus abdominis; pons; lateral nuclear group of thalamus; trabecular bone; palpebral conjunctiva / Top expressed in: quadriceps femoris muscle; epiblast; muscle of thigh; skeletal muscle tissue; neural layer of retina; tail of embryo; granulocyte; ventricular zone; embryo; dentate gyrus of hippocampal formation granule cell; More reference expression data
BioGPS	More reference expression data
Gene ontology
Molecular function	transferase activity; nucleotide binding; protein binding; ATP binding; kinase activity; phosphoglycerate kinase activity; protein-disulfide reductase (NAD(P)) activity; ADP binding
Cellular component	cytoplasm; membrane raft; cytosol; extracellular exosome; membrane; extracellular space
Biological process	gluconeogenesis; epithelial cell differentiation; phosphorylation; canonical glycolysis; glycolytic process; negative regulation of angiogenesis; plasminogen activation; cellular response to hypoxia; response to hypoxia; chemical synaptic transmission; myoblast fusion; somatic muscle development; muscle cell cellular homeostasis; positive regulation of oxidative phosphorylation
Sources:Amigo / QuickGO
Orthologs
Species	Human	Mouse
Entrez	5230	18655
Ensembl	ENSG00000102144	ENSMUSG00000062070
UniProt	P00558	P09411
RefSeq (mRNA)	NM_000291	NM_008828
RefSeq (protein)	NP_000282	NP_032854
Location (UCSC)	Chr X: 77.91 – 78.13 Mb	Chr X: 105.23 – 105.25 Mb
PubMed search
- Wikidata
View/Edit Human	View/Edit Mouse

Phosphoglycerate kinase 1 is an enzyme that in humans is encoded by the PGK1 gene.

== Interactive pathway map ==
Click on genes, proteins and metabolites below to link to respective articles. (Note: The interactive pathway map can be edited at WikiPathways: "GlycolysisGluconeogenesis_WP534".)

Glycolysis and Gluconeogenesis edit
