= Barakat–Perenthaler syndrome =

Neurodevelopmental genetic disorder

Barakat–Perenthaler syndrome is a rare neurodevelopmental genetic disorder, presenting with a severe epileptic encephalopathy, developmental delay, Intellectual disability, progressive microcephaly and visual disturbance. It is listed by the standard reference, Online Mendelian Inheritance in Man (OMIM) as #618744. and classified as EPILEPTIC ENCEPHALOPATHY, EARLY INFANTILE, 83; EIEE83. It was first described in 2019 by Dr. Stefan Barakat and his team at the Erasmus University Medical Center in Rotterdam in the journal Acta Neuropathologica; the most recent reviews were published in Epilepsy Currents and Trends in Endocrinology and Metabolism.

== Presentation ==
Barakat–Perenthaler syndrome OMIM 618744 has so far been identified in more than 40 individuals, of which 22 individuals from 15 families were published. According to OMIM's review of all published cases and the initial study from Perenthaler et al, all children presented in early life with severe and intractable epileptic seizures. Severe developmental delay was found in all individuals, with basically absence of all developmental milestones. Children were unable to roll over or sit, did not develop speech, had absent visual tracking and most cases required gastro-intestinal tube feeding due to severe orofacial hypotonia. Other neurological features included infantile epileptic spasms, axial hypotonia, peripheral spasticity and/or hyperreflexia, and a few cases showed dystonia. Head circumference decreased progressively over time. MRI brain imaging did not detect major structural brain abnormalities, but showed progressive brain atrophy over time. Mild dysmorphic features were noted amongst several individuals, including a sloping forehead, suture ridging, bitemporal narrowing, high hairline, arched eyebrows, pronounced philtrum, and a relatively small mouth and large ears. Most children died early in life.

== Genetics and disease mechanism ==
Barakat–Perenthaler syndrome is an autosomal recessive disorder and is caused by a recurrent homozygous mutation of the UDP-glucose pyrophosphorylase (UGP2) gene. UGP2 encodes an essential protein in nucleotide sugar metabolism, which catabolizes the conversion of glucose-1-phosphate to UDP-glucose. In humans, two functionally equivalent protein isoforms are encoded by the UGP2 gene, a longer one (isoform 1) and a slightly shorter one (isoform 2), that only differ by 11 amino acids at the N-terminal. The recurrent mutation (chr2:64083454A>G) identified in all patients with the syndrome affects the start codon of the shorter protein isoform. Hence, the shorter isoform can no longer be produced in affected individuals. It was shown by Barakat and colleagues that the shorter UGP2 isoform is predominantly expressed in human brain. Therefore, the recurrent mutation leads to a brain-specific depletion of the essential UGP2 protein, resulting in altered glycogen metabolism, upregulated unfolded protein response and premature neuronal differentiation which likely cause the disease symptoms.

A complete loss of UGP2 isoform 1 and isoform 2 in human embryonic stem cells prevented the formation of functional heart and blood cells in in vitro differentiation experiments. Hence it is likely that bi-allelic loss-of-function of all UGP2 isoforms is incompatible with life in humans; in agreement with this, no bi-allelic loss-of-function variants affecting both protein isoforms are reported in the gnomAD database. The syndrome is therefore an example of a disease caused by the loss of expression of a tissue relevant isoform of an essential gene. Recently, bi-allelic loss of UDP-Glucose 6-Dehydrogenase (UGDH), another gene implicated in nucleotide sugar metabolism, was also shown to cause a similar severe epileptic encephalopathy syndrome, referred to by OMIM as Jamuar syndrome (OMIM #618792), showing that nucleotide sugar metabolism can be more broadly implicated in epilepsy.

== Origin of the founder mutation ==
Barakat and colleagues showed that all identified affected individuals harboring the recurrent mutation shared the same haplotype, suggesting a founder effect and a common ancestor. The mutation was estimated to have originated 26 generations (approximately 600 years) ago. Most cases of Barakat–Perenthaler syndrome could be linked to the Balochistan region (consisting of parts of Iran, Pakistan, India). Since Dutch traders were active in that region in the 17th century, this could be an explanation for the introduction of the founder mutation into the Dutch population, from which the first case was described

== Treatment ==
So far, no treatment is available for Barakat–Perenthaler syndrome.
