= Phosphoglucomutase (glucose-cofactor) =

phosphoglucomutase (glucose-cofactor)

Identifiers
- EC no.: 5.4.2.5
- CAS no.: 37278-22-1

Databases
- IntEnz: IntEnz view
- BRENDA: BRENDA entry
- ExPASy: NiceZyme view
- KEGG: KEGG entry
- MetaCyc: metabolic pathway
- PRIAM: profile
- PDB structures: RCSB PDB PDBe PDBsum
- Gene Ontology: AmiGO / QuickGO
Search
- PMC: articles
- PubMed: articles
- NCBI: proteins

In enzymology, a phosphoglucomutase (glucose-cofactor) (EC 5.4.2.5) is an enzyme that catalyzes the chemical reaction

alpha-D-glucose 1-phosphate ⇌ D-glucose 6-phosphate

Hence, this enzyme has one substrate, alpha-D-glucose 1-phosphate, and one product, D-glucose 6-phosphate.

This enzyme belongs to the family of isomerases, specifically the phosphotransferases (phosphomutases), which transfer phosphate groups within a molecule. The systematic name of this enzyme class is alpha-D-glucose 1,6-phosphomutase (glucose-cofactor). Other names in common use include glucose phosphomutase, and glucose-1-phosphate phosphotransferase. This enzyme has at least one effector, D-Glucose.
