= Glycogen storage disease type 0 =

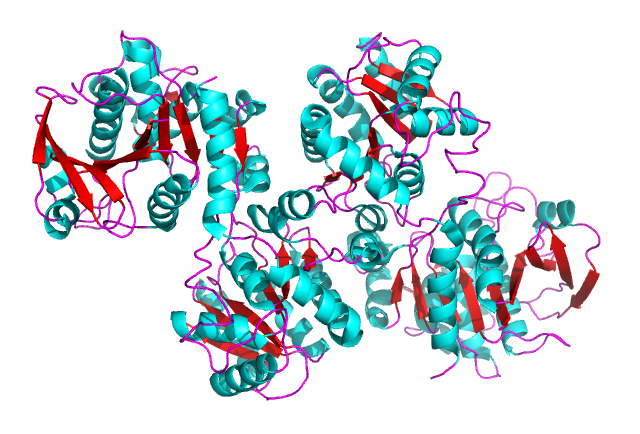
- Glycogen storage disease type 0 has defect in glycogen synthase
- Specialty: Medical genetics

Glycogen storage disease type 0 is a disease characterized by a deficiency in the glycogen synthase enzyme (GSY). Although glycogen synthase deficiency does not result in storage of extra glycogen in the liver, it is often classified as a glycogen storage disease because it is another defect of glycogen storage and can cause similar problems. There are two isoforms (types) of glycogen synthase enzyme; GSY1 in muscle and GSY2 in the liver, each with a corresponding form of the disease. Mutations in the liver isoform (GSY2), causes fasting hypoglycemia, high blood ketones, increased free fatty acids and low levels of alanine and lactate. Conversely, feeding in these patients results in hyperglycemia and hyperlactatemia.

== Signs and symptoms ==
The most common clinical history in patients with glycogen storage disease type 0 (GSD-0) is that of an infant or child with symptomatic hypoglycemia or seizures that occur before breakfast or after an inadvertent fast. In affected infants, this event typically begins after they outgrow their nighttime feeds. In children, this event may occur during acute GI illness or periods of poor enteral intake.

Mild hypoglycemic episodes may be clinically unrecognized, or they may cause symptoms such as drowsiness, sweating, lack of attention, or pallor. Uncoordinated eye movements, disorientation, seizures, and coma may accompany severe episodes.

Glycogen-storage disease type 0 affects only the liver. Growth delay may be evident with height and weight percentiles below average. Abdominal examination findings may be normal or reveal only mild hepatomegaly. Signs of acute hypoglycemia may be present, including the following:

- Lethargy
- Apathy
- Jitteriness
- Diaphoresis
- Tachycardia
- Pallor
- Nausea and vomiting
- Headache
- Mental confusion
- Visual disturbances
- Dysarthria
- Hypotonia
- Ataxia
- Seizures
- Coma

== Causes ==
Genetic defects in the liver glycogen synthetase gene (GYS2) cause glycogen-storage disease type 0. The gene is located on chromosome band 12p12.2.

Glycogen synthetase catalyzes the rate-limiting reaction for glycogen synthesis in the liver by transferring glucose units from uridine 5'-diphosphate (UDP)-glucose to a glycogen primer. Its action is highly regulated by a mechanism of phosphorylation and dephosphorylation and modulated by counter-regulatory hormones including insulin, epinephrine, and glucagon.

Mutations in the gene for liver glycogen synthetase (GYS2, 138571) result in decreased or absent activity of liver glycogen synthetase and moderately decreased amounts of structurally normal glycogen in the liver. Mutational studies of patients with glycogen storage disease type 0 do not demonstrate correlations between genotype and phenotype. [3] A different gene (GYS1, 138570) encodes muscle glycogen synthetase, which has normal activity in patients with glycogen storage disease type 0A.

== Pathophysiology ==
In the early stages of fasting, the liver provides a steady source of glucose from glycogen breakdown (or glycogenolysis). With prolonged fasting, glucose is generated in the liver from noncarbohydrate precursors through gluconeogenesis. Such precursors include alanine (derived from the breakdown of proteins in skeletal muscle) and glycerol (derived from the breakdown of triacylglycerols in fat cells). In patients with glycogen storage disease type 0, fasting hypoglycemia occurs within a few hours after a meal because of the limited stores of hepatic glycogen and inadequate gluconeogenesis to maintain normoglycemia. Feeding characteristically results in postprandial hyperglycemia and glucosuria, in addition to increased blood lactate levels, because glycogen synthesis is limited, and excess glucose is preferentially converted to lactate using the glycolytic pathway.

== Diagnostic ==
Important clinical criteria to consider in the evaluation of a child with hypoglycemia and suspected glycogen-storage disease type 0 (GSD-0) include (1) the presence or absence of hepatomegaly; (2) the characteristic schedule of hypoglycemia, including unpredictable, postprandial, short fast, long fast, or precipitating factors; (3) the presence or absence of lactic acidosis; (4) any associated hyperketosis or hypoketosis; and (5) any associated liver failure or cirrhosis. The differential diagnosis also includes ketotic hypoglycemia. Patients with ketotic hypoglycemia have a normal response to glucagon in the fed state. Patients with glycogen-storage disease type 0 have a normal-to-increased response to glucagon in the fed state, with hyperglycemia and lactic acidemia.

=== Laboratory Studies ===
Serum glucose levels are measured to document the degree of hypoglycemia. Serum electrolytes calculate the anion gap to determine the presence of metabolic acidosis; typically, patients with glycogen storage disease type 0 (GSD-0) have an anion gap in the reference range and no acidosis. See the Anion Gap calculator.

Serum lipids (including triglyceride and total cholesterol) may be measured. In patients with glycogen storage disease type 0, hyperlipidemia is absent or mild and proportional to the degree of fasting.

Urine (first voided specimen with a dipstick test for ketones and reducing substances) may be analyzed. In patients with glycogen storage disease type 0, urine ketones findings are positive, and urine-reducing substance findings are negative. However, urine-reducing substance findings are positive (fructosuria) in those with fructose 1-phosphate aldolase deficiency (fructose intolerance).

Serum lactate is in reference ranges in fasting patients with glycogen storage disease type 0.

Liver function studies provide evidence of mild hepatocellular damage in patients with mild elevations of aspartate aminotransferase (AST) and alanine aminotransferase (ALT) levels.Plasma amino-acid analysis shows plasma alanine levels as in reference ranges during a fast.

=== Imaging Studies ===
Skeletal radiography may reveal osteopenia.

=== Other Tests ===
Evaluation of a patient with suspected glycogen-storage disease type 0 requires monitored assessment of fasting adaptation in an inpatient setting.

Patients typically have hypoglycemia and ketosis, with lactate and alanine levels in the low or normal part of the reference range approximately 5–7 hours after fasting.

A glucagon tolerance test may be needed if the fast fails to elicit the expected rise in plasma glucose. Lactate and alanine levels are in the reference range.

By contrast, a glucagon challenge test after a meal causes hyperglycemia, with increased levels of plasma lactate and alanine.

Oral loading of glucose, galactose, or fructose results in a marked rise in blood lactate levels.

=== Procedures ===
A liver biopsy for microscopic analysis and enzyme assay is required for definitive diagnosis. Diagnosis may include linkage analysis in families with affected members and sequencing of the entire coding region of the GSY2 gene for mutations.

=== Histologic Findings ===
Histologic analysis of liver tissue demonstrates moderately decreased amounts of periodic acid-Schiff (PAS)–positive, diastase-sensitive glycogen stores.

Evidence of increased fat accumulation in the liver may be observed, as in other glycogen-storage diseases.

Electron microscopic analysis of liver sections shows normal glycogen structure.

Muscle glycogen stores are normal.

=== Differential Diagnoses ===
- Acute Hypoglycemia
- Fructose 1-Phosphate Aldolase Deficiency (Hereditary fructose intolerance).

=== Types ===
There are two types of glycogen storage disease type 0 to be considered, they are:

- Glycogen storage disease due to liver glycogen synthase deficiency
- Glycogen storage disease due to muscle and heart glycogen synthase deficiency

== Treatment ==
The goal for treatment of Glycogen-storage disease type 0 is to avoid hypoglycemia. This is accomplished by avoiding fasting by eating every 1–2 hours during the day. At night, uncooked corn starch can be given because it is a complex glucose polymer. This will be acted on slowly by pancreatic amylase and glucose will be absorbed over a 6-hour period.

== Epidemiology ==
The overall frequency of glycogen-storage disease is approximately 1 case per 20,000–25,000 people. Glycogen-storage disease type 0 is a rare form, representing less than 1% of all cases. The identification of asymptomatic and oligosymptomatic siblings in several glycogen-storage disease type 0 families has suggested that glycogen-storage disease type 0 is underdiagnosed.

=== Mortality/Morbidity ===
The major morbidity is a risk of fasting hypoglycemia, which can vary in severity and frequency. Major long-term concerns include growth delay, osteopenia, and neurologic damage resulting in developmental delay, intellectual deficits, and personality changes.

=== Sex ===
No sexual predilection is observed because the deficiency of glycogen synthetase activity is inherited as an autosomal recessive trait.

=== Age ===
Glycogen-storage disease type 0 is most commonly diagnosed during infancy and early childhood.
