= Lipoyl synthase, mitochondrial =

Protein-coding gene in humans

LIAS

Identifiers
- Aliases: LIAS, LAS, LIP1, LS, PDHLD, HUSSY-01, HGCLAS, lipoic acid synthetase
- External IDs: OMIM: 607031; MGI: 1934604; GeneCards: LIAS
Enzyme activity
EC #	BRENDA	ExPASy	KEGG	MetaCyc
2.8.1.8	↗	↗	↗	↗

Gene location (Human)
Chr.	Chromosome 4 (human)
Band	4p14	Start	39,459,004 bp
Band	4p14	End	39,485,109 bp

Gene location (Mouse)
Chr.	Chromosome 5 (mouse)
Band	5|5 C3.1	Start	65,548,840 bp
Band	5|5 C3.1	End	65,568,036 bp
RNA expression pattern
Bgee	Human / Mouse (ortholog); Top expressed in: gonad; muscle of thigh; gastrocnemius muscle; rectum; right testis; right lobe of liver; left testis; right adrenal gland; body of pancreas; mucosa of transverse colon / Top expressed in: facial motor nucleus; medullary collecting duct; olfactory epithelium; hair follicle; brown adipose tissue; otic vesicle; lacrimal gland; saccule; otic placode; digastric muscle; More reference expression data
BioGPS	n/a
Gene ontology
Molecular function	transferase activity; 4 iron, 4 sulfur cluster binding; iron-sulfur cluster binding; catalytic activity; metal ion binding; lipoate synthase activity; sulfurtransferase activity
Cellular component	mitochondrial matrix; mitochondrion
Biological process	cellular nitrogen compound metabolic process; lipoate biosynthetic process; protein lipoylation; neural tube closure; inflammatory response; response to oxidative stress; response to lipopolysaccharide
Sources:Amigo / QuickGO
Orthologs
Databases	NCBI: entry; OMA: entry
Species	Human	Mouse
Entrez	11019	79464
Ensembl	ENSG00000121897	ENSMUSG00000029199
UniProt	O43766	Q99M04
RefSeq (mRNA)	NM_001278590; NM_001278591; NM_001278592; NM_006859; NM_194451 NM_001363700	NM_024471; NM_001310612
RefSeq (protein)	NP_001265519; NP_001265520; NP_001265521; NP_006850; NP_919433 NP_001350629	NP_001297541; NP_077791
Location (UCSC)	Chr 4: 39.46 – 39.49 Mb	Chr 5: 65.55 – 65.57 Mb
PubMed search
- Wikidata
View/Edit Human	View/Edit Mouse

Lipoyl synthase, mitochondrial is an enzyme that in humans is encoded by the LIAS gene.

== Function ==
The protein encoded by this gene belongs to the biotin and lipoic acid synthetases family. It localizes in mitochondrion and plays an important role in alpha-(+)-lipoic acid synthesis. It may also function in the sulfur insertion chemistry in lipoate biosynthesis. Alternative splicing occurs at this locus and two transcript variants encoding distinct isoforms have been identified. [provided by RefSeq, Jul 2008].
