= FBP1 =

Protein-coding gene in the species Homo sapiens

Identifiers
- Aliases: FBP1, FBP, fructose-bisphosphatase 1
- External IDs: OMIM: 611570; MGI: 95492; GeneCards: FBP1
Available structures
PDB	Ortholog search: PDBe RCSB
PDB	List of PDB id codes 1FTA, 2FHY, 2FIE, 2FIX, 2JJK, 2VT5, 2WBB, 2WBD, 2Y5K, 2Y5L, 3A29, 3KBZ, 3KC0, 3KC1, 4MJO
Enzyme activity
EC #	BRENDA	ExPASy	KEGG	MetaCyc
3.1.3.11	↗	↗	↗	↗

Gene location (Human)
Chr.	Chromosome 9 (human)
Band	9q22.32	Start	94,603,133 bp
Band	9q22.32	End	94,640,249 bp

Gene location (Mouse)
Chr.	Chromosome 13 (mouse)
Band	13|13 B3	Start	63,012,567 bp
Band	13|13 B3	End	63,036,096 bp
RNA expression pattern
Bgee	Human / Mouse (ortholog); Top expressed in: right lobe of liver; jejunal mucosa; mucosa of ileum; duodenum; human kidney; right lung; upper lobe of left lung; kidney tubule; monocyte; mucosa of transverse colon / Top expressed in: left lobe of liver; right kidney; human kidney; seminiferous tubule; gallbladder; spermatocyte; spermatid; proximal tubule; epithelium of small intestine; Ileal epithelium; More reference expression data
BioGPS	n/a
Gene ontology
Molecular function	protein binding; metal ion binding; phosphoric ester hydrolase activity; identical protein binding; hydrolase activity; catalytic activity; monosaccharide binding; AMP binding; phosphatase activity; fructose 1,6-bisphosphate 1-phosphatase activity
Cellular component	cytoplasm; extracellular exosome; cytosol; nucleus
Biological process	fructose metabolic process; fructose 6-phosphate metabolic process; cellular response to magnesium ion; metabolism; dephosphorylation; regulation of gluconeogenesis; negative regulation of cell growth; protein homotetramerization; negative regulation of Ras protein signal transduction; gluconeogenesis; sucrose biosynthetic process; fructose 1,6-bisphosphate metabolic process; carbohydrate metabolic process; negative regulation of transcription by RNA polymerase II; negative regulation of glycolytic process
Sources:Amigo / QuickGO
Orthologs
Databases	NCBI: entry; OMA: entry
Species	Human	Mouse
Entrez	2203	14121
Ensembl	ENSG00000165140	ENSMUSG00000069805
UniProt	P09467	Q9QXD6
RefSeq (mRNA)	NM_000507; NM_001127628	NM_019395
RefSeq (protein)	NP_000498; NP_001121100	NP_062268
Location (UCSC)	Chr 9: 94.6 – 94.64 Mb	Chr 13: 63.01 – 63.04 Mb
PubMed search
- Wikidata
View/Edit Human	View/Edit Mouse

Fructose-1,6-bisphosphatase 1 is a protein that in humans is encoded by the FBP1 gene.

== Function ==
Fructose-1,6-bisphosphatase 1, a gluconeogenesis regulatory enzyme, catalyzes the hydrolysis of fructose 1,6-bisphosphate to fructose 6-phosphate and inorganic phosphate. Fructose-1,6-diphosphatase deficiency is associated with hypoglycemia and metabolic acidosis.The human FBP1 gene was cloned in 1988 by Solomon and colleagues at Memorial Sloan Kettering Cancer Center, who reported the cDNA sequence and expression pattern of the enzyme fructose‑1,6‑bisphosphatase in human tissues.
