= Glucose 6-phosphate =

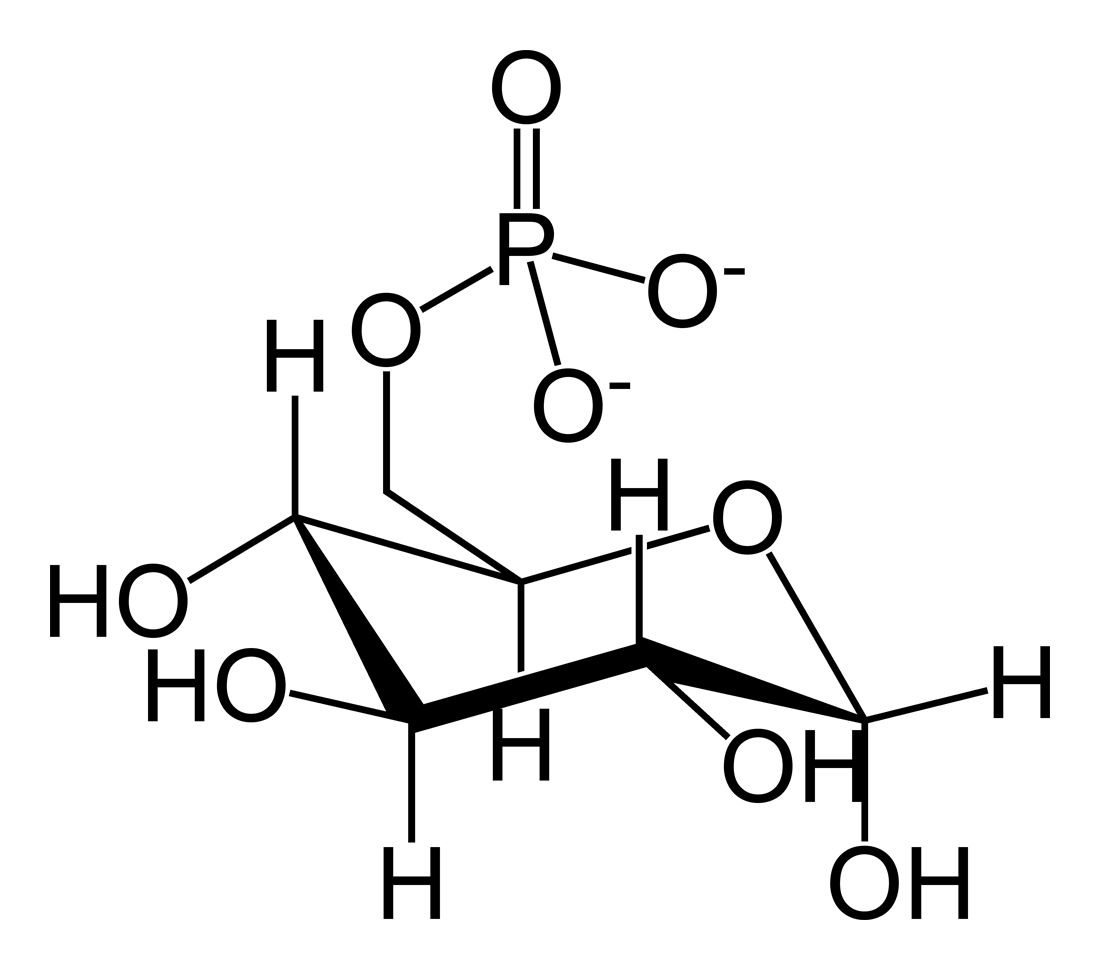

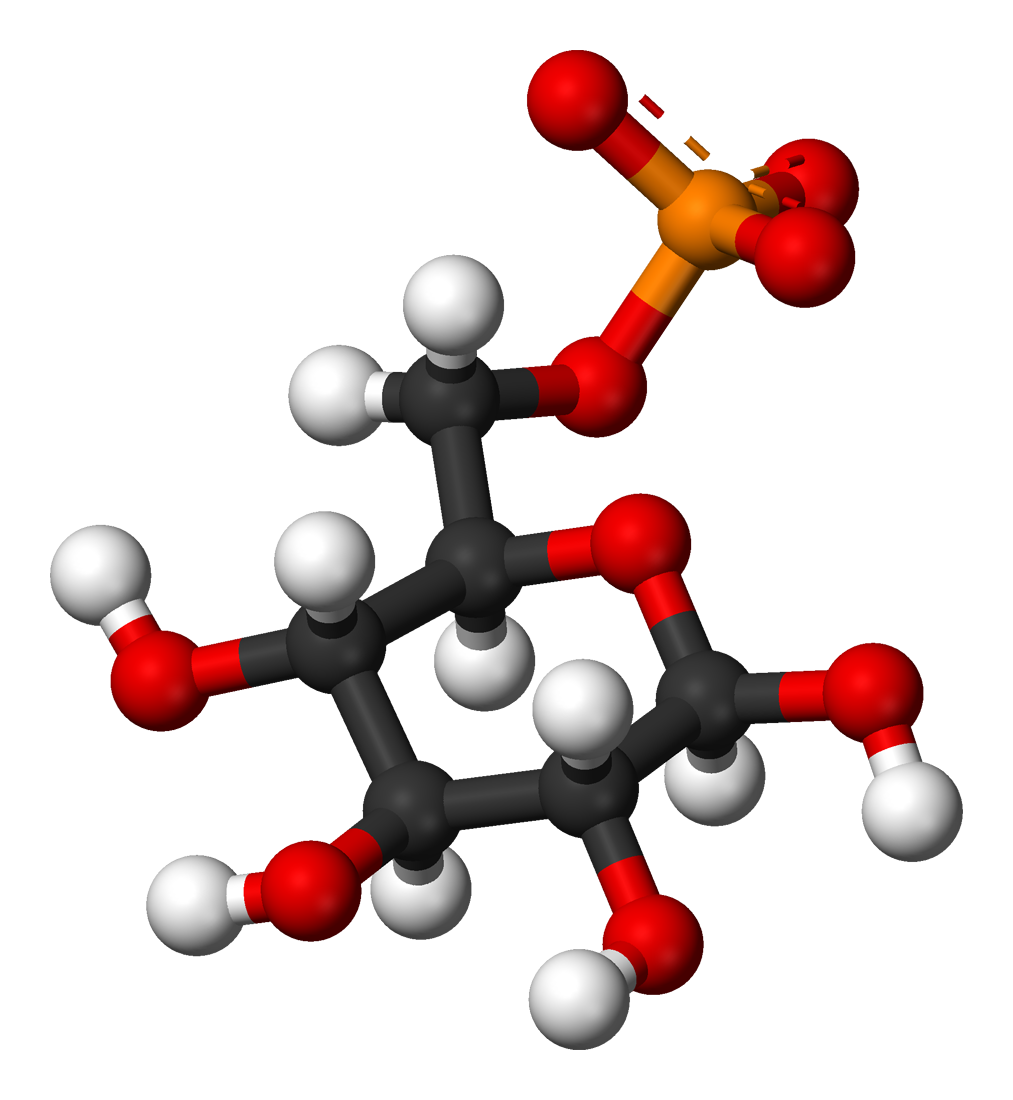

Names
- IUPAC names D-Glucopyranose 6-phosphate 6-O-Phosphono-D-glucopyranose

Identifiers
CAS Number	56-73-5
3D model (JSmol)	Interactive image
ChEBI	CHEBI:4170
ChemSpider	17216117
IUPHAR/BPS	4647
KEGG	C00092
MeSH	Glucose-6-phosphate
PubChem CID	439284
UNII	375AW34SQA
- InChI: InChI=1S/C6H11O9P/c7-3-2(1-14-16(11,12)13)15-6(10)5(9)4(3)8/h2-10H,1H2,(H2,11,12,13)/t2-,3-,4+,5-,6?/m1/s1 Key: NBSCHQHZLSJFNQ-GASJEMHNSA-N; InChI=1/C6H11O9P/c7-3-2(1-14-16(11,12)13)15-6(10)5(9)4(3)8/h2-10H,1H2,(H2,11,12,13)/t2-,3-,4+,5-,6u/m1/s1 Key: NBSCHQHZLSJFNQ-SEZHTIIRBF
- SMILES: O[C@H]1[C@H](O)[C@@H](COP(O)(O)=O)OC(O)[C@@H]1O

Properties
Chemical formula	C_{6}H_{13}O_{9}P
Molar mass	260.136
- Except where otherwise noted, data are given for materials in their standard state (at 25 °C [77 °F], 100 kPa). verify (what is ?) Infobox references

Glucose 6-phosphate (G6P, sometimes called the Robison ester) is a glucose sugar phosphorylated at the hydroxy group on carbon 6. This dianion is very common in cells as the majority of glucose entering a cell will become phosphorylated in this way.

Because of its prominent position in cellular chemistry, glucose 6-phosphate has many possible fates within the cell. It lies at the start of two major metabolic pathways: glycolysis and the pentose phosphate pathway.

In addition to these two metabolic pathways, glucose 6-phosphate may also be converted to glycogen or starch for storage. This storage is in the liver and muscles in the form of glycogen for most multicellular animals, and in intracellular starch or glycogen granules for most other organisms.

== Production ==
=== From glucose ===
Within a cell, glucose 6-phosphate is produced by phosphorylation of glucose on the sixth carbon. This is catalyzed by the enzyme hexokinase in most cells, and, in higher animals, glucokinase in certain cells, most notably liver cells. One equivalent of ATP is consumed in this reaction.

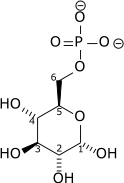
D-Glucose	Hexokinase		α-D-Glucose 6-phosphate
	ATP	ADP
	Glucose 6-phosphatase

Compound C00031 at KEGG Pathway Database. Enzyme 2.7.1.1 at KEGG Pathway Database. Compound C00668 at KEGG Pathway Database. Reaction R01786 at KEGG Pathway Database.

The major reason for the immediate phosphorylation of glucose is to prevent diffusion out of the cell. The phosphorylation adds a charged phosphate group so the glucose 6-phosphate cannot easily cross the cell membrane.

=== From glycogen ===
Glucose 6-phosphate is also produced during glycogenolysis from glucose 1-phosphate, the first product of the breakdown of glycogen polymers.

== Pentose phosphate pathway ==
When the ratio of NADP^{+} to NADPH increases, the body needs to produce more NADPH (a reducing agent for several reactions like fatty acid synthesis and glutathione reduction in erythrocytes). This will cause the G6P to be dehydrogenated to 6-phosphogluconate by glucose 6-phosphate dehydrogenase. This irreversible reaction is the initial step of the pentose phosphate pathway, which generates the useful cofactor NADPH as well as ribulose-5-phosphate, a carbon source for the synthesis of other molecules. Also, if the body needs nucleotide precursors of DNA for growth and synthesis, G6P will also be dehydrogenated and enter the pentose phosphate pathway.

== Glycolysis ==
If the cell needs energy or carbon skeletons for synthesis, then glucose 6-phosphate is targeted for glycolysis. Glucose 6-phosphate is first isomerized to fructose 6-phosphate by phosphoglucose isomerase, which uses magnesium as a cofactor.

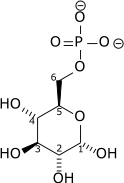
α-D-Glucose 6-phosphate	Phosphoglucose isomerase	β-D-Fructose 6-phosphate
	Phosphoglucose isomerase

Compound C00668 at KEGG Pathway Database. Enzyme 5.3.1.9 at KEGG Pathway Database. Compound C05345 at KEGG Pathway Database. Reaction R00771 at KEGG Pathway Database.

This reaction converts glucose 6-phosphate to fructose 6-phosphate in preparation for phosphorylation to fructose 1,6-bisphosphate. The addition of the second phosphoryl group to produce fructose 1,6-bisphosphate is an irreversible step, and so is used to irreversibly target the glucose 6-phosphate breakdown to provide energy for ATP production via glycolysis.

Click on genes, proteins and metabolites below to link to respective articles. (Note: The interactive pathway map can be edited at WikiPathways: "GlycolysisGluconeogenesis_WP534".)

Glycolysis and Gluconeogenesis edit

== Storage as glycogen ==
If blood glucose levels are high, the body needs a way to store the excess glucose. After being converted to G6P, the molecule can be turned into glucose 1-phosphate by phosphoglucomutase. Glucose 1-phosphate can then be combined with uridine triphosphate (UTP) to form UDP-glucose, driven by the hydrolysis of UTP, releasing phosphate. Now, the activated UDP-glucose can add to a growing glycogen molecule with the help of glycogen synthase. This is a very efficient storage mechanism for glucose since it costs the body only one ATP to store the one glucose molecule and virtually no energy to remove it from storage. Glucose 6-phosphate is an allosteric activator of glycogen synthase, which makes sense because when the level of glucose is high the body should store the excess glucose as glycogen. On the other hand, glycogen synthase is inhibited when it is phosphorylated by protein kinase during times of high stress or low levels of blood glucose, via hormone induction by glucagon or adrenaline.

When the body needs glucose for energy, glycogen phosphorylase, with the help of an orthophosphate, can cleave away a molecule from the glycogen chain. The cleaved molecule is in the form of glucose 1-phosphate, which can be converted into G6P by phosphoglucomutase. Next, the phosphoryl group on G6P can be cleaved by glucose 6-phosphatase so that a free glucose can be formed. This free glucose can pass through membranes and can enter the bloodstream to travel to other places in the body.

== Dephosphorylation and release into bloodstream ==
Liver cells express the transmembrane enzyme glucose 6-phosphatase in the endoplasmic reticulum. The catalytic site is found on the lumenal face of the membrane, and removes the phosphate group from glucose 6-phosphate produced during glycogenolysis or gluconeogenesis. Free glucose is transported out of the endoplasmic reticulum via GLUT7 and released into the bloodstream via GLUT2 for uptake by other cells. Muscle cells lack this enzyme, so myofibers use glucose 6-phosphate in their own metabolic pathways such as glycolysis. Importantly, this prevents myocytes from releasing glycogen stores they have obtained into the blood.

== See also ==
- Glucose
- Glucose 1-phosphate
- Glucose-6-phosphate dehydrogenase deficiency
- Glycogen
- Pentose phosphate pathway
