= Phosphoglucomutase =

Metabolic enzyme

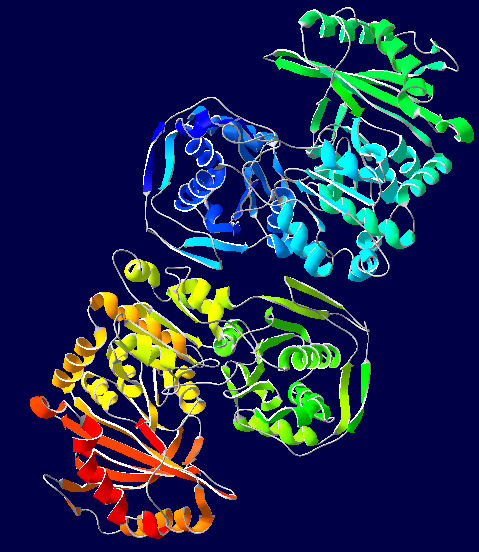
- Rabbit muscle phosphoglucomutase, drawn from PDB: 1JDY

Identifiers
- EC no.: 5.4.2.2
- CAS no.: 9001-81-4

Databases
- IntEnz: IntEnz view
- BRENDA: BRENDA entry
- ExPASy: NiceZyme view
- KEGG: KEGG entry
- MetaCyc: metabolic pathway
- PRIAM: profile
- PDB structures: RCSB PDB PDBe PDBsum
Search
- PMC: articles
- PubMed: articles
- NCBI: proteins

Phosphoglucomutase (EC 5.4.2.2) is an enzyme that transfers a phosphate group on an α-D-glucose monomer from the 1 to the 6 position in the forward direction or the 6 to the 1 position in the reverse direction.

α-D-glucose 1-phosphate
Glucose 6-phosphate

== Function ==
=== Role in glycogenolysis ===
After glycogen phosphorylase catalyzes the phosphorolytic cleavage of a glucosyl residue from the glycogen polymer, the freed glucose has a phosphate group on its 1-carbon. This glucose 1-phosphate molecule is not itself a useful metabolic intermediate, but phosphoglucomutase catalyzes the conversion of this glucose 1-phosphate to glucose 6-phosphate (see below for the mechanism of this reaction).

Glucose 6-phosphate’s metabolic fate depends on the needs of the cell at the time it is generated. If the cell is low on energy, then glucose 6-phosphate will travel down the glycolytic pathway, eventually yielding two molecules of adenosine triphosphate. If the cell is in need of biosynthetic intermediates, glucose 6-phosphate will enter the pentose phosphate pathway, where it will undergo a series of reactions to yield riboses and/or NADPH, depending on cellular conditions.

If glycogenolysis is taking place in the liver, glucose 6-phosphate can be converted to glucose by the enzyme glucose 6-phosphatase; the glucose produced in the liver is then released to the bloodstream for use in other organs. Muscle cells in contrast do not have the enzyme glucose 6-phosphatase, so they cannot share their glycogen stores with the rest of the body.

=== Role in glycogenesis ===
Phosphoglucomutase also acts in the opposite fashion when blood glucose levels are high. In this case, phosphoglucomutase catalyzes the conversion of glucose 6-phosphate (which is easily generated from glucose by the action of hexokinase) to glucose 1-phosphate.

This glucose-1-phosphate can then react with UTP to yield UDP-glucose in a reaction catalyzed by UDP-glucose-pyrophosphorylase. If activated by insulin, glycogen synthase will proceed to clip the glucose from the UDP-glucose complex onto a glycogen polymer.

== Reaction mechanism ==
Phosphoglucomutase affects a phosphoryl group shift by exchanging a phosphoryl group with the substrate. Isotopic labeling experiments have confirmed that this reaction proceeds through a glucose 1,6-bisphosphate intermediate.

The first step in the forward reaction is the transfer of a phosphoryl group from the enzyme to glucose 1-phosphate, forming glucose 1,6-bisphosphate and leaving a dephosphorylated form of the enzyme. The enzyme then undergoes a rapid diffusional reorientation to position the 1-phosphate of the bisphosphate intermediate properly relative to the dephosphorylated enzyme. Substrate-velocity relationships and induced transport tests have revealed that the dephosphorylated enzyme then facilitates the transfer of a phosphoryl group from the glucose-1,6-bisphosphate intermediate to the enzyme, regenerating phosphorylated phosphoglucomutase and yielding glucose 6-phosphate (in the forward direction). Later structural studies confirmed that the single site in the enzyme that becomes phosphorylated and dephosphorylated is the oxygen of the active-site serine residue (see diagram below). A bivalent metal ion, usually magnesium or cadmium, is required for enzymatic activity and has been shown to complex directly with the phosphoryl group esterified to the active-site serine.

Mechanism for the phosphoglucomutase-catalyzed interconversion of glucose 1-phosphate and glucose 6-phosphate.

This formation of a glucose 1,6-bisphosphate intermediate is analogous to the interconversion of 2-phosphoglycerate and 3-phosphoglycerate catalyzed by phosphoglycerate mutase, in which 2,3-bisphosphoglycerate is generated as an intermediate.

== Structure ==
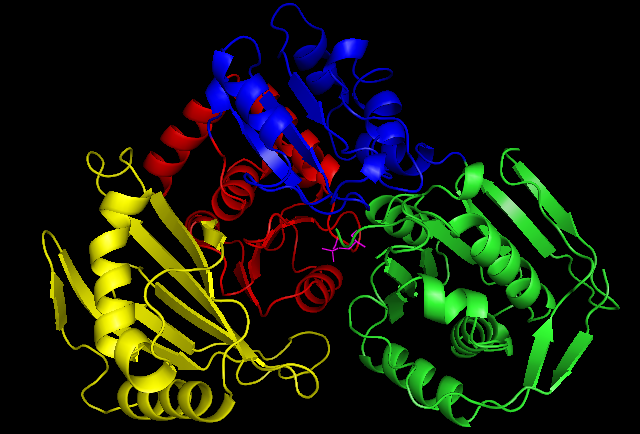
The four domains of rabbit muscle phosphoglucomutase, drawn from PDB: 1JDY. Green = Domain I, Blue = Domain II, Red = Domain III, Yellow = Domain IV. Pink residue = Serine 116.

While rabbit muscle phosphoglucomutase has served as the prototype for much of the elucidation of this enzyme's structure, newer bacterium-derived crystal structures exhibit many of the same defining characteristics. Each phosphoglucomutase monomer can be divided into four sequence domains, I-IV, based on the enzyme’s default spatial configuration (see image at right).

Each monomer comprises four distinct α/β structural units, each of which contains one of the four strands in each monomer's β-sheet and is made up only of the residues in a given sequence domain (see image at right). The burial of the active site (including Ser-116, the critical residue on the enzyme that is phosphorylated and dephosphorylated) in the hydrophobic interior of the enzyme serves to exclude water from counterproductively hydrolyzing critical phosphoester bonds while still allowing the substrate to access the active site.

== Disease relevance ==
Human muscle contains two isoenzymes of phosphoglucomutase with nearly identical catalytic properties, PGM I and PGM II. One or the other of these forms is missing in some humans congenitally. PGM1 deficiency is known as PGM1-CDG or CDG syndrome type 1t (CDG1T), formerly known as glycogen storage disease type 14 (GSD XIV). The disease is both a glycogenosis and a congenital disorder of glycosylation. It is also a metabolic myopathy and an inborn error of carbohydrate metabolism.

PGM deficiency is an extremely rare condition that does not have a set of well-characterized physiological symptoms. This condition can be detected by an in vitro study of anaerobic glycolysis which reveals a block in the pathway toward lactic acid production after glucose 1-phosphate but before glucose 6-phosphate. There are two forms of PGM1-CDG: 1.) exclusively myogenic, and 2.) multi-system (including muscles).

The usual pathway for glycogen formation from blood glucose is blocked, as without phosphoglucomutase, glucose-6-phosphate cannot convert into glucose-1-phosphate. However, an alternative pathway from galactose can form glycogen by converting galactose → galactose-1-phosphate → glucose-1-phosphate. This allows glycogen to form, but without phosphoglucomutase, glucose-1-phosphate cannot convert into glucose-6-phosphate for glycolysis. This causes abnormal glycogen accumulation in muscle cells, observable in muscle biopsy.

Although the phenotype and severity of the disease is highly variable, common symptoms include: exercise intolerance, exercise-induced hyperammonemia, abnormal glycogen accumulation in muscle biopsy, elevated serum CK, abnormal serum transferrin (loss of complete N-glycans), short stature, cleft palate, bifid uvula, and hepatopathy.

A "second wind" phenomenon is observable in some, but not all, by measuring heart rate while on a treadmill. At rest, muscle cells rely on blood glucose and free fatty acids; upon exertion, muscle glycogen is needed along with blood glucose and free fatty acids. The reliance on muscle glycogen increases with higher-intensity aerobic exercise and all anaerobic exercise.

Without being able to create ATP from stored muscle glycogen, during exercise there is a low ATP reservoir (ADP>ATP). Under such circumstances, the heart rate and breathing increases inappropriately given the exercise intensity, in an attempt to maximize the delivery of oxygen and blood borne fuels to the muscle cell. Free fatty acids are the slowest of the body's bioenergetic systems to produce ATP by oxidative phosphorylation, at approximately 10 minutes. The relief of exercise intolerance symptoms, including a drop in heart rate of at least 10 BPM while going the same speed on the treadmill, after approximately 10 minutes of aerobic exercise is called "second wind," where increased ATP is being produced from free fatty acids.

Another consequence of a low ATP reservoir (ADP>ATP) during exercise, due to not being able to produce ATP from muscle glycogen, is increased use of the myokinase (adenylate kinase) reaction and the purine nucleotide cycle. The myokinase reaction produces AMP (2 ADP → ATP + AMP), and then the purine nucleotide cycle both uses AMP and produces more AMP along with fumarate (the fumarate is then converted and produces ATP via oxidative phosphorylation). Ammonia (NH_{3}) is a byproduct in the purine nucleotide cycle when AMP is converted into IMP. During a non-ischemic forearm test, PGM1-CDG individuals show exercise-induced elevated serum ammonia (hyperammonemia) and normal serum lactate rise.

Studies in other diseases that have a glycolytic block have shown during ischemic and non-ischemic forearm exercise tests, that not only does ammonia rise, but after exercise, rises also in serum inosine, hypoxanthine, and uric acid. These studies supported that when the exercise is stopped or sufficient ATP is produced from other fuels (such as free fatty acids), then the ATP reservoir normalizes and the buildup of AMP and other nucleotides covert into nucleosides and leave the muscle cell to be converted into uric acid, known as myogenic hyperuricemia. AMP → IMP → Inosine → Hypoxanthine → Xanthine → Uric acid. Unfortunately, the studies on PGM1-CDG only tested for serum ammonia and lactate, so it is currently unknown definitively whether PGM1-CDG individuals also experience myogenic hyperuricemia.

== Genes ==
- PGM1, PGM2, PGM3, PGM5

== See also ==
- Beta-phosphoglucomutase
- Congenital disorder of glycosylation
- Exercise intolerance § Low ATP reservoir in muscles
- Glycogen storage disease
- Inborn errors of carbohydrate metabolism
- Metabolic myopathies
- Mutase
- Purine nucleotide cycle (ADP>ATP, AMP↑)
- Second wind (exercise phenomenon)
