= Glycogen synthase =

Enzyme class, includes all types of glycogen/starch syntheses

glycogen (starch) synthase
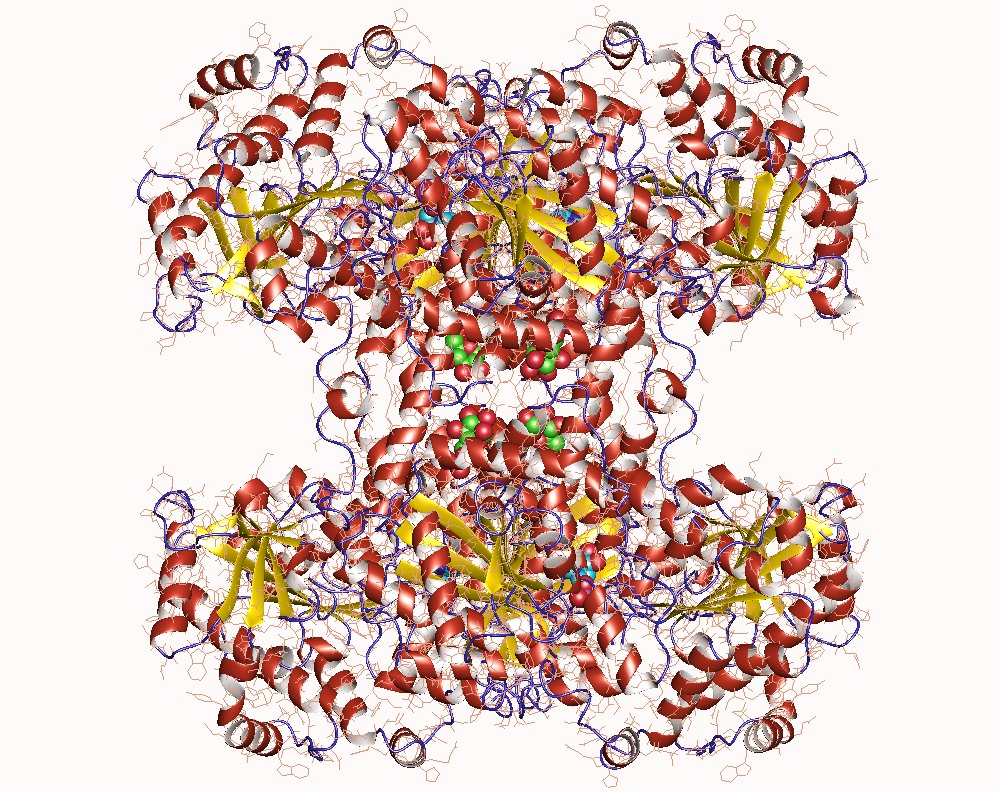
- Glycogen synthase homotetramer, Saccharomyces cerevisiae

Identifiers
- EC no.: 2.4.1.11
- CAS no.: 9014-56-6

Databases
- BRENDA: enzyme data
- ExPASy: NiceZyme view
- KEGG: enzyme entry
- MetaCyc: metabolic pathway
- Rhea: reactions
- PDB structures: RCSB PDB PDBe PDBsum
- Gene Ontology: AmiGO / QuickGO
Search
- PMC: articles
- PubMed: articles
- NCBI: proteins

Glycogen synthase (UDP-glucose-glycogen glucosyltransferase) is a key enzyme in glycogenesis, the conversion of glucose into glycogen. It is a glycosyltransferase (EC 2.4.1.11) that catalyses the reaction of UDP-glucose and (1,4-α-D-glucosyl)_{n} to yield UDP and (1,4-α-D-glucosyl)_{n+1}.

== Structure ==
Much research has been done on glycogen degradation through studying the structure and function of glycogen phosphorylase, the key regulatory enzyme of glycogen degradation. On the other hand, much less is known about the structure of glycogen synthase, the key regulatory enzyme of glycogen synthesis. The crystal structure of glycogen synthase from Agrobacterium tumefaciens, however, has been determined at 2.3 A resolution. In its asymmetric form, glycogen synthase is found as a dimer, whose monomers are composed of two Rossmann-fold domains. This structural property, among others, is shared with related enzymes, such as glycogen phosphorylase and other glycosyltransferases of the GT-B superfamily. Nonetheless, a more recent characterization of the Saccharomyces cerevisiae (yeast) glycogen synthase crystal structure reveals that the dimers may actually interact to form a tetramer. Specifically, The inter-subunit interactions are mediated by the α15/16 helix pairs, forming allosteric sites between subunits in one combination of dimers and active sites between subunits in the other combination of dimers. Since the structure of eukaryotic glycogen synthase is highly conserved among species, glycogen synthase likely forms a tetramer in humans as well.

Glycogen synthase can be classified in two general protein families. The first family (GT3), which is from mammals and yeast, is approximately 80 kDa, uses UDP-glucose as a sugar donor, and is regulated by phosphorylation and ligand binding. The second family (GT5), which is from bacteria and plants, is approximately 50 kDA, uses ADP-glucose as a sugar donor, and is unregulated.

== Mechanism ==
Although the catalytic mechanisms used by glycogen synthase are not well known, structural similarities to glycogen phosphorylase at the catalytic and substrate binding site suggest that the mechanism for synthesis is similar in glycogen synthase and glycogen phosphorylase.

== Function ==
Glycogen synthase catalyzes the conversion of the glucosyl (Glc) moiety of uridine diphosphate glucose (UDP-Glc) into glucose to be incorporated into glycogen via an α(1→4) glycosidic bond. However, since glycogen synthase requires an oligosaccharide primer as a glucose acceptor, it relies on glycogenin to initiate de novo glycogen synthesis.

In a recent study of transgenic mice, an overexpression of glycogen synthase and an overexpression of phosphatase both resulted in excess glycogen storage levels. This suggests that glycogen synthase plays an important biological role in regulating glycogen/glucose levels and is activated by dephosphorylation.

=== Isozymes ===
In humans, there are two paralogous isozymes of glycogen synthase:

isozyme	tissue distribution	gene
glycogen synthase 1	muscle and other tissues	GYS1
glycogen synthase 2	liver	GYS2

The liver enzyme expression is restricted to the liver, whereas the muscle enzyme is widely expressed. Liver glycogen serves as a storage pool to maintain the blood glucose level during fasting, whereas muscle glycogen synthesis accounts for disposal of up to 90% of ingested glucose. The role of muscle glycogen is as a reserve to provide energy during bursts of activity.

Meanwhile, the muscle isozyme plays a major role in the cellular response to long-term adaptation to hypoxia. Notably, hypoxia only induces expression of the muscle isozyme and not the liver isozyme. However, muscle-specific glycogen synthase activation may lead to excessive accumulation of glycogen, leading to damage in the heart and central nervous system following ischemic insults.

glycogen synthase 1 (muscle)

Identifiers
- Symbol: GYS1
- NCBI gene: 2997
- HGNC: 4706
- OMIM: 138570
- RefSeq: NM_002103
- UniProt: P13807

Other data
- EC number: 2.4.1.11
- Locus: Chr. 19 q13.3
Search for
- Structures: Swiss-model
- Domains: InterPro

glycogen synthase 2 (liver)

Identifiers
- Symbol: GYS2
- NCBI gene: 2998
- HGNC: 4707
- OMIM: 138571
- RefSeq: NM_021957
- UniProt: P54840

Other data
- EC number: 2.4.1.11
- Locus: Chr. 12 p12.2-11.2
Search for
- Structures: Swiss-model
- Domains: InterPro

== Regulation ==
The reaction is highly regulated by allosteric effectors such as glucose 6-phosphate (activator) and by phosphorylation reactions (deactivating). Glucose-6-phosphate allosteric activating action allows glycogen synthase to operate as a glucose-6-phosphate sensor. The inactivating phosphorylation is triggered by the hormone glucagon, which is secreted by the pancreas in response to decreased blood glucose levels. The enzyme also cleaves the ester bond between the C1 position of glucose and the pyrophosphate of UDP itself.

The control of glycogen synthase is a key step in regulating glycogen metabolism and glucose storage. Glycogen synthase is directly regulated by glycogen synthase kinase 3 (GSK-3), AMPK, protein kinase A (PKA), and casein kinase 2 (CK2). Each of these protein kinases leads to phosphorylated and catalytically inactive glycogen synthase. The phosphorylation sites of glycogen synthase are summarized below.

Name	Phosphorylation site	Kinase	Reference(s)
Site 1a	Ser 697	PKA	
Site 1b	Ser 710	PKA, CaMKII	
Site 2	Ser 7	PKA, PhK, AMPK	
Site 2a	Ser 10	CK1	
Site 3a	Ser 640	GSK-3	
Site 3b	Ser 644	GSK-3	
Site 3c	Ser 648	GSK-3	
Site 4	Ser 652	GSK-3	
Site 5	Ser 656	CK2	

For enzymes in the GT3 family, these regulatory kinases inactivate glycogen synthase by phosphorylating it at the N-terminal of the 25th residue and the C-terminal of the 120th residue. Glycogen synthase is also regulated by protein phosphatase 1 (PP1), which activates glycogen synthase via dephosphorylation. PP1 is targeted to the glycogen pellet by four targeting subunits, G_{M}, G_{L}, PTG and R6. These regulatory enzymes are regulated by insulin and glucagon signaling pathways.

== Clinical significance ==
Mutations in the GYS1 gene are associated with glycogen storage disease type 0. In humans, defects in the tight control of glucose uptake and utilization are also associated with diabetes and hyperglycemia. Patients with type 2 diabetes normally exhibit low glycogen storage levels because of impairments in insulin-stimulated glycogen synthesis and suppression of glycogenolysis. Insulin stimulates glycogen synthase by inhibiting glycogen synthase kinases or/and activating protein phosphatase 1 (PP1) among other mechanisms.
