= Epigastric hernia =

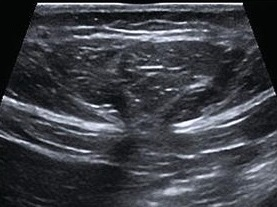
- Abdominal ultrasound of a midline epigastric hernia.
- Specialty: General surgery

An epigastric hernia is a type of hernia that causes fat to push through a weakened area in the walls of the abdomen. It may develop in the epigastrium (upper, central part of the abdomen). Epigastric hernias are more common in adults and usually appear above the umbilical region of the abdomen. It is a common condition that is usually asymptomatic although sometimes their unusual clinical presentation can present a diagnostic dilemma for the clinician. Unlike the benign diastasis recti, epigastric hernia may trap fat and other tissues inside the opening of the hernia, causing pain and tissue damage. It is usually present at birth and may appear and disappear only when the patient is doing an activity that creates abdominal pressure, pushing to have bowel movements, or crying.

== Symptoms ==
- Pain
- tenderness
- redness
- Impulse on cough

== Causes ==
- Obesity
- Pregnancy.
- Frequent heavy lifting
- Genetic defects
- Aging
- Severe vomiting

== Diagnosis ==
Computed tomography scans of the suspected areas with intravenous contrast can assist in diagnosis. Doctors are also able to identify whether it is a suspected hernia by palpating the affected area.

Ultrasonography is also used for diagnostic purposes.

== Treatment ==
Symptomatic epigastric hernias are repaired with surgery. Even if they are asymptomatic, they can be surgically corrected for cosmetic reasons. In general, cosmetic surgery on infants is delayed until the infant is older and better able to tolerate anesthesia. If the size of the hernia is greater than 4 cm, then a hernioplasty or herniorrhaphy surgery is required.

== Prognosis ==
Epigastric hernia becomes a problem when the hernia becomes incarcerated or loses blood supply to that area. This can be life-threatening.

== See also ==
- Diastasis recti
