= Diastasis recti =

Increased gap between right and left rectus abdominis muscles

- Other names: Abdominal separation
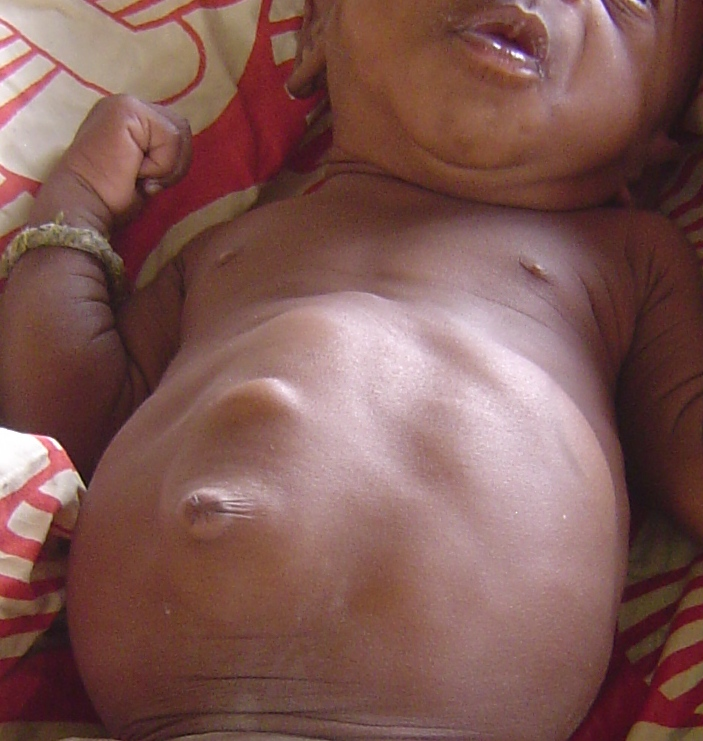
- Diastasis recti in an infant
- Specialty: Pediatrics

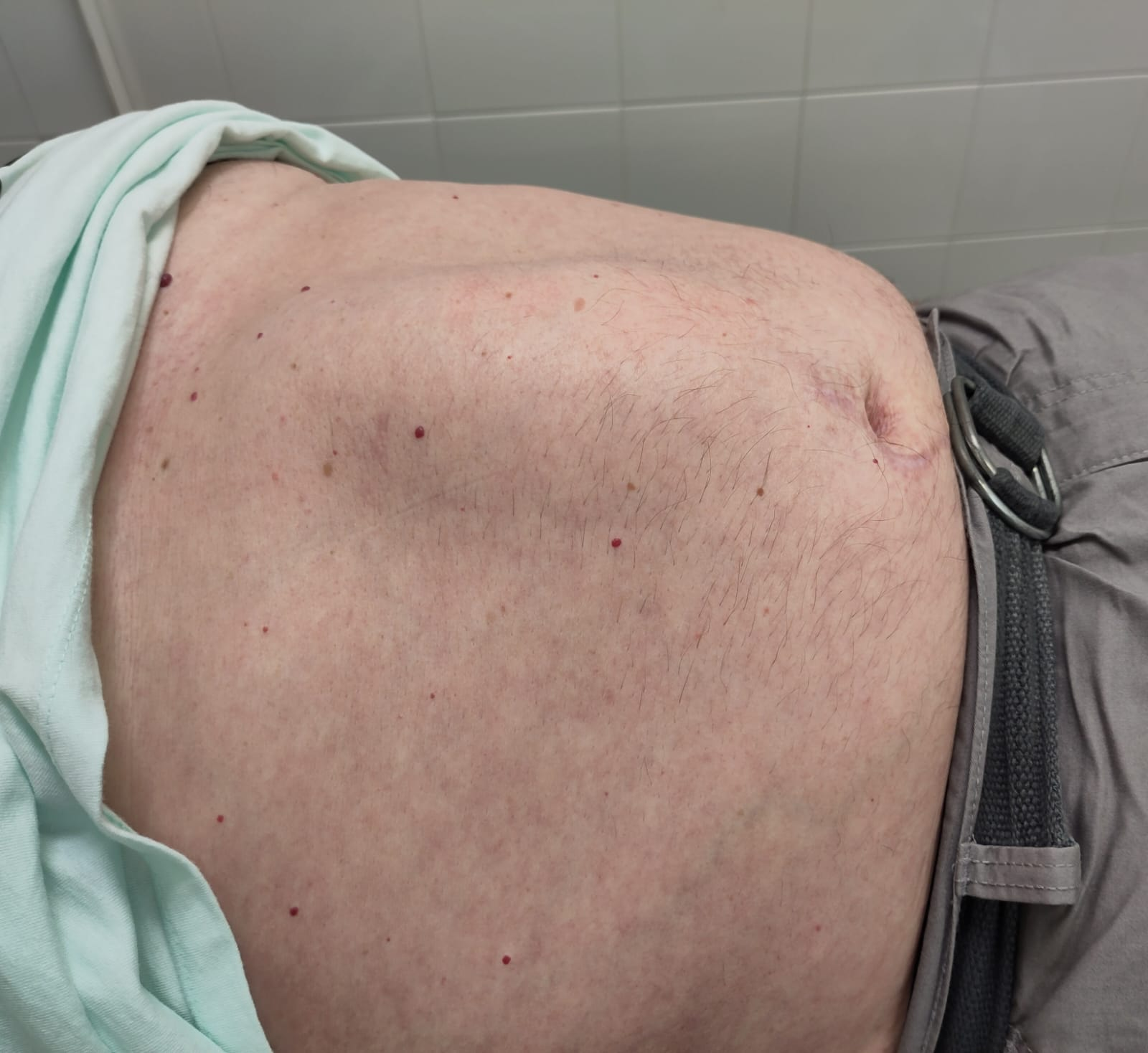
Diastasis recti. 72-year-old man, epigastric protrusion when raising the head.

Diastasis recti, or rectus abdominis diastasis, is an increased gap between the right and left rectus abdominis muscles. The increased distance between the muscles is created by the stretching of the linea alba, a connective collagen sheath created by the aponeurosis insertions of the transverse abdominis, internal oblique, and external oblique. This condition has no associated morbidity or mortality. Physical therapy is often successful in repairing this separation, and surgery is an option for more severe cases. While standard exercise can slow or prevent the complete healing of the separated muscles, safe core and pelvic floor exercise can improve or resolve the condition.

== Populations Affected ==
Diastasis of the rectus abdominis muscle occurs in the general population and is particularly common in certain groups. Studies have shown that there is a high prevalence in postpartum women, but that it can also occur in newborns and any adult woman or man.

=== Newborns ===
In the newborn, the rectus abdominis is not fully developed and may not be sealed together at midline. Diastasis recti is more common in premature newborns. In infants, they typically result from a minor defect of the linea alba between the rectus abdominis muscles. This allows tissue from inside the abdomen to herniate anteriorly. On infants, this may manifest as an apparent 'bubble' under the skin of the belly between the umbilicus and xiphisternum (bottom of the breastbone).

=== Pregnant and Postpartum Women ===
In pregnant or postpartum women, the condition is caused by the stretching of the rectus abdominis by the growing size of the uterus. It is more common in multiparous women (women who have had multiple pregnancies) owing to repeated episodes of stretching. When diastasis recti occurs during pregnancy, the uterus can sometimes be seen bulging through the abdominal wall beneath the skin. Another cause can be excessive abdominal exercises after the first trimester of pregnancy. Women are more susceptible to develop diastasis recti when over the age of 35 or with high birth weight of child, multiple birth pregnancy, or multiple pregnancies.

Strength training of all the core muscles, including the abdominis recti muscle, may reduce the size of the gap in pregnant or postpartum women. Crunches may increase the diastasis recti separation. All corrective exercises should be in the form of pulling in the abdominal muscles rather than pushing them outwards. In extreme cases diastasis recti is corrected with a cosmetic surgery procedure known as an abdominoplasty by creating a plication, or folding, of the linea alba and suturing it together, which results in a tighter abdominal wall.

== Presentation ==
A diastasis recti may appear as a ridge running down the midline of the abdomen, anywhere from the xiphoid process to the umbilicus. It becomes more prominent with straining and may disappear when the abdominal muscles are relaxed. The medial borders of the right and left halves of the muscle may be palpated during contraction of the rectus abdominis.

Beyond an abdominal bulge, diastasis recti can cause a number of other painful symptoms and complications. These include:

- Leaking (urinary incontinence)
- Pelvic pain
- Pain with sex
- Prolapse
- Low back pain
- Pelvic floor dysfunction
- Umbilical hernia*

*The condition can be diagnosed by physical exam, and must be differentiated from an epigastric hernia or incisional hernia, if the patient has had abdominal surgery. Hernias may be ruled out using ultrasound.

== Diagnosis ==
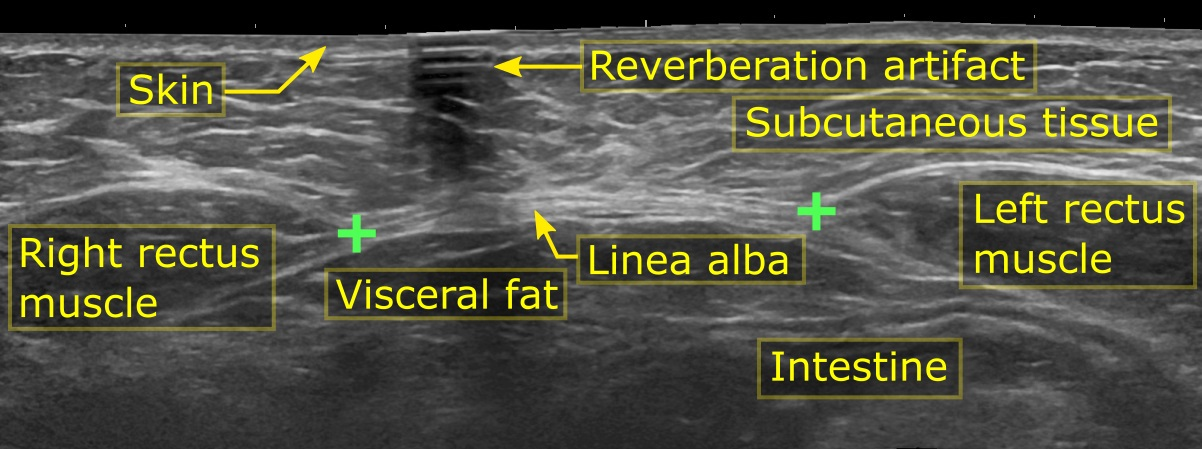
Abdominal ultrasound of diastasis recti, being the distance between the green crosses.

Diastasis recti can be diagnosed by physical examination, which may include measuring the distance between the rectus abdominis muscles at rest and during contraction at several levels along the linea alba. Diastasis recti is defined as a gap of about 2.7 cm or greater between the two sides of the rectus abdominis muscle. Abdominal ultrasonography provides objective evidence for the diagnosis, and also confirms that the bulge is not a hernia. An abdominal CT scan may also visualise diastasis recti.

Examination is performed with the subject lying on the back, knees bent at 90° with feet flat, head slightly lifted placing chin on chest. With muscles tense, the examiner then places fingers in the ridge that is presented. Measurement of the width of separation is determined by the number of fingertips that can fit within the space between the left and right rectus abdominis muscles. Separation consisting of a width of 2 fingertips (approximately 1 1/2 centimeters) or more is the determining factor for diagnosing diastasis recti.

== Treatment ==
- During pregnancy - No treatment is necessary for women while they are still pregnant.
- After delivery - Typically the separation of the abdominal muscles will lessen in the mother within the first 8 weeks after childbirth; however, the connective tissue remains stretched for many. The weakening of the musculature may also cause lower back pain, weakened pelvic alignment, and altered posture. For many, diastasis recti is a condition which they have to live with for many years later.
- In children - Complications include development of an umbilical or ventral hernia, which is rare and can be corrected with surgery.

=== Strength training ===
A 2014 systematic review found that the width of the gap in diastasis recti may be reduced by exercising during and after pregnancy.

A 2018 review mentions other techniques in addition to strengthening exercises: postural training; education and training for proper lifting mechanisms; manual therapy (which includes soft tissue mobilization); myofascial release; Noble technique (i.e., manual approximation of abdominal muscles during partial sit-up); and abdominal bracing and taping. Other techniques to strengthen abdominal muscles are using Pilates and functional training.

=== Surgery ===
In extreme cases, diastasis recti is corrected with a cosmetic surgery procedure known as an abdominoplasty by creating a plication or folding of the linea alba and suturing together. This creates a tighter abdominal wall. There are two surgical methods: one more common through plication of the anterior rectus sheath; and the other through hernia repair, considering suture closure of the hernia sac combined with mesh reinforcement. Two studies showed few post-operative complications.

== Diastasis recti in animals ==
A similar condition has been observed in a newborn calve (crossbred with Belgian Blue cattle), with lack of welding of abdominal muscles behind ombilic.

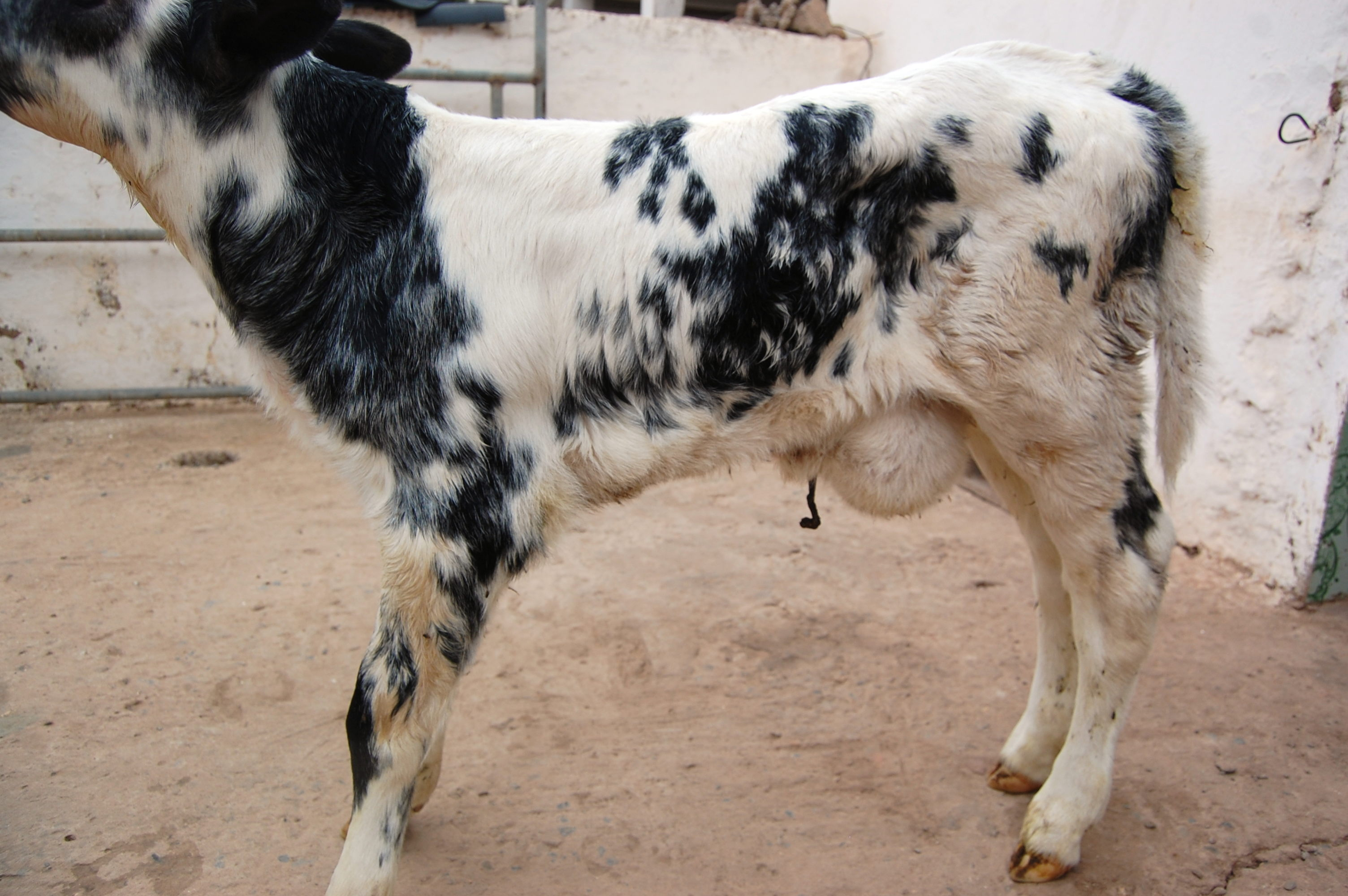

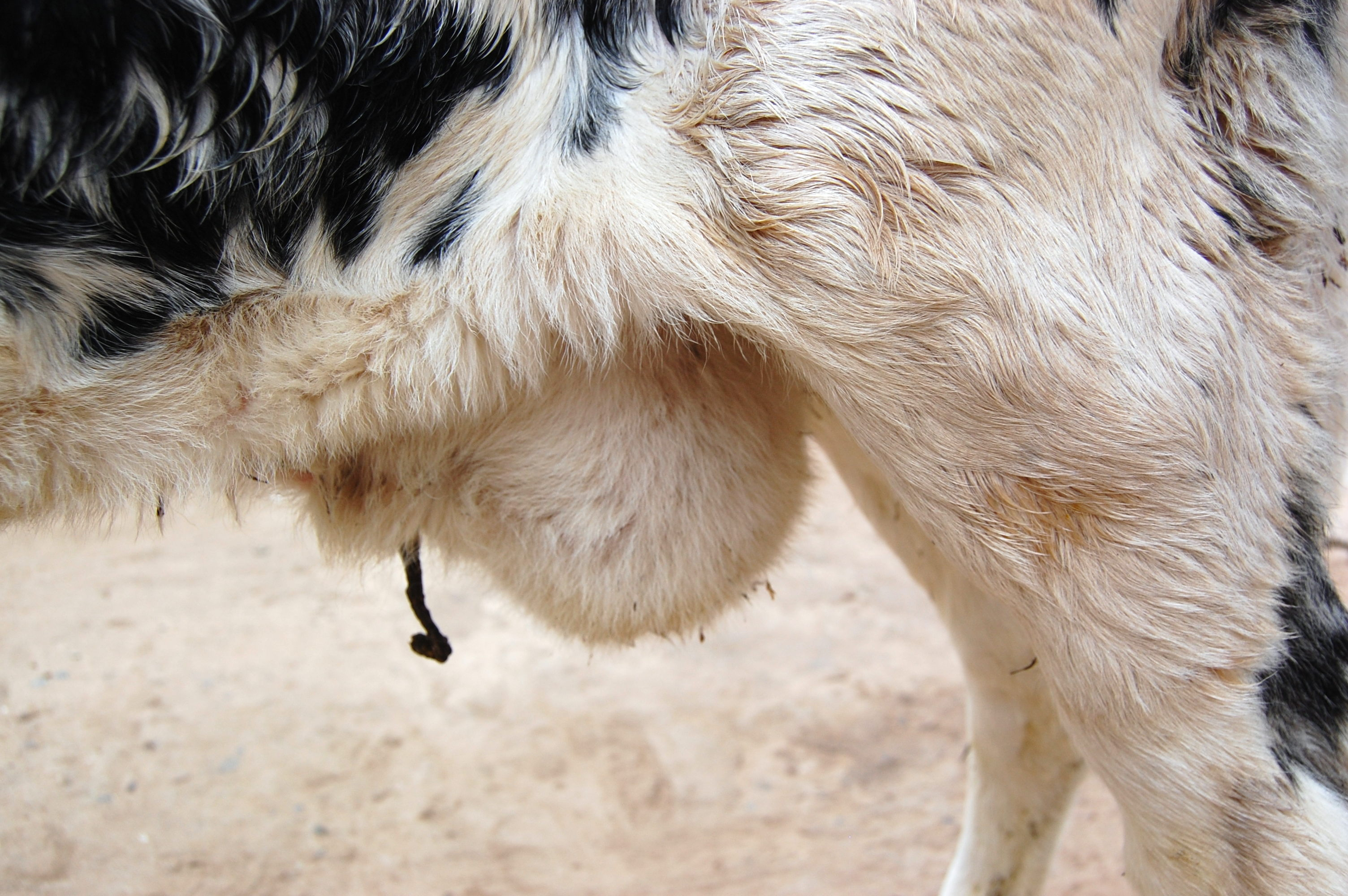

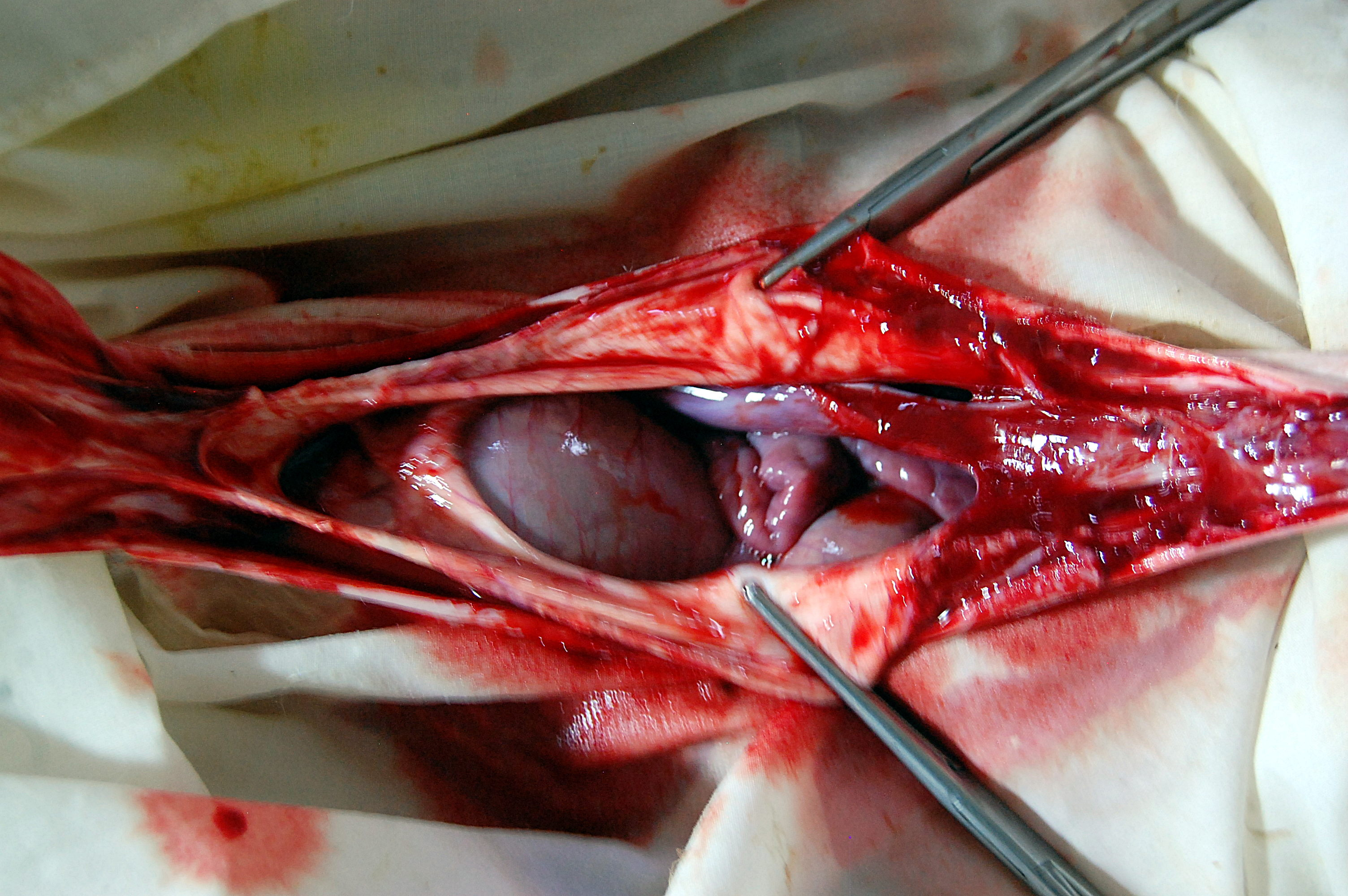
