= Liver span =

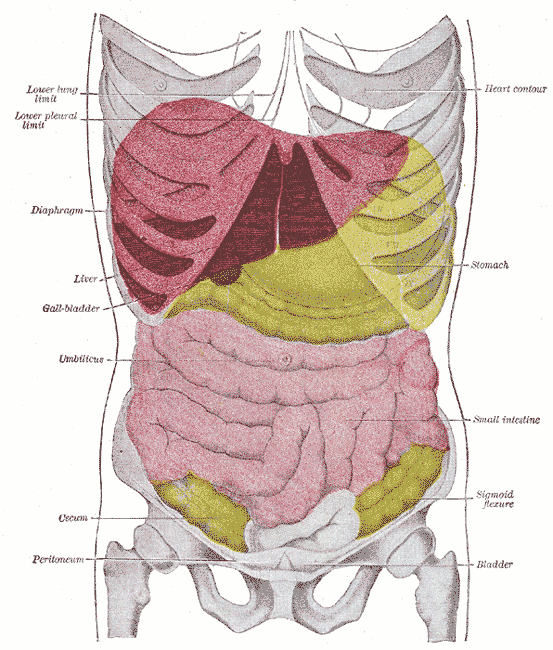
- Anterior view of the position of the liver (red) in the human abdomen.

The liver span is a measurement performed during physical examination to determine the size of the liver and identify possible hepatomegaly.

It is the distance between the lower border of the liver in the mid-clavicular line obtained by palpation, and the upper border of the liver in the mid-clavicular line detected by percussion (the upper border of the liver lies behind the ribs and can not be palpated). More accurate methods of estimating liver span include ultrasound and cross-sectional imaging (computed tomography or magnetic resonance imaging).

Normal liver span is 6–12 cm (2.4–4.7 in), but varies with age, height, and weight. Depending on the physician's technique, estimates of the same liver span can vary by 8 cm (3.1 in), on average.
