= Hepatomegaly =

Enlargement of the liver

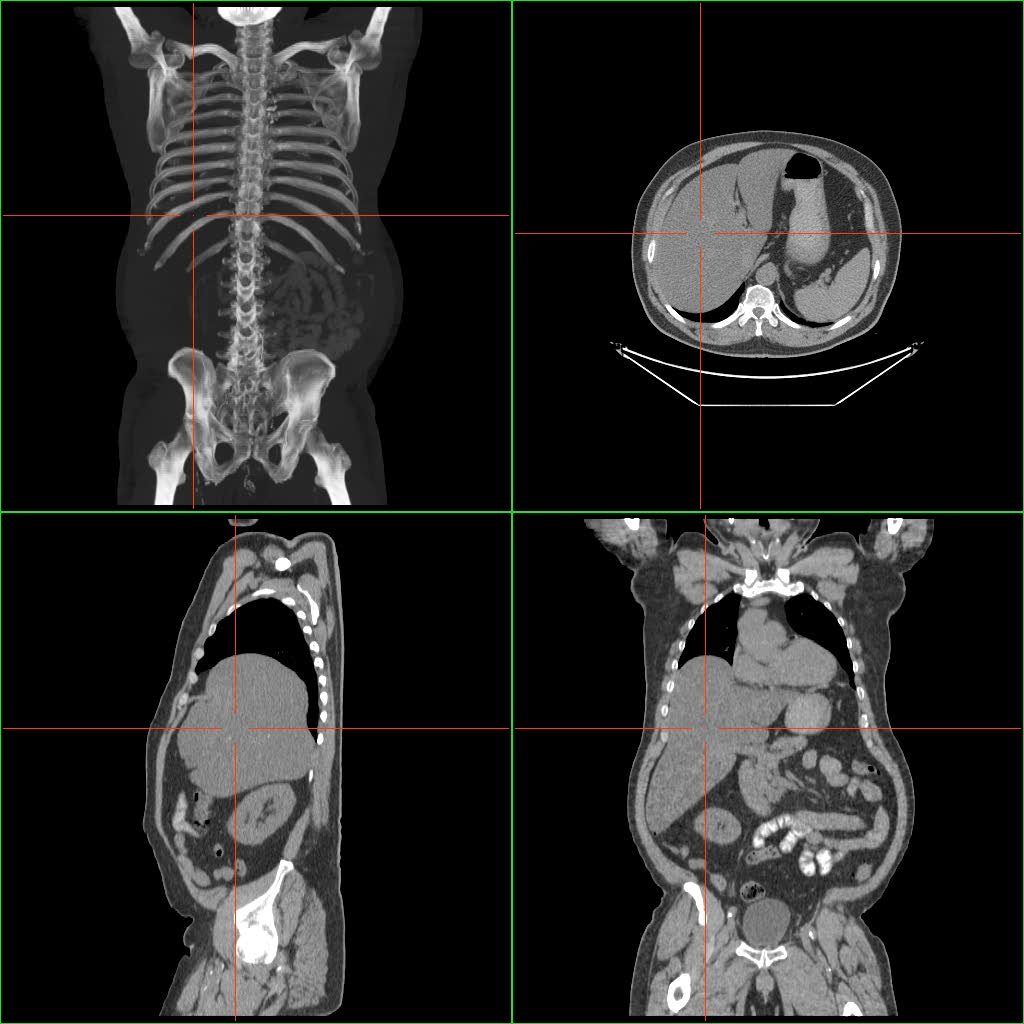
- Computerized tomography of affected person with hepatomegaly
- Specialty: Hepatology
- Symptoms: Weight loss, lethargy
- Causes: Liver abscess (pyogenic abscess), Malaria
- Diagnostic method: Abdominal ultrasonography
- Treatment: Prednisone and azathioprine

Hepatomegaly is enlargement of the liver. It is a non-specific medical sign, having many causes, which can broadly be broken down into infection, hepatic tumours, and metabolic disorder. Often, hepatomegaly presents as an abdominal mass. Depending on the cause, it may sometimes present along with jaundice.

== Signs and symptoms ==
The patient may experience many symptoms, including weight loss, poor appetite, and lethargy; jaundice and bruising may also be present.

== Causes ==
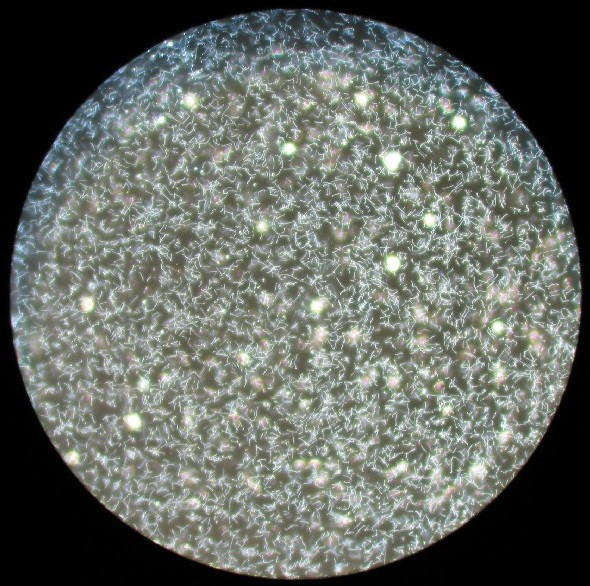
Leptospirosis

Among the causes of hepatomegaly are the following:

=== Infective ===
- Glandular fever (Infectious mononucleosis)
- Hepatitis (A, B, C)
- Liver abscess (pyogenic abscess)
- Malaria
- Amoeba infections
- Hydatid cyst
- Leptospirosis
- Actinomycosis

=== Neoplastic ===
- Metastatic tumours
- Hepatocellular carcinoma
- Myeloma
- Leukemia
- Lymphoma

=== Biliary ===
- Primary biliary cirrhosis.
- Primary sclerosing cholangitis.

=== Metabolic ===
- Haemochromatosis
- Cholesteryl ester storage disease
- Porphyria
- Wilson's disease
- Niemann–Pick disease
- Non-alcoholic fatty liver disease.
- Glycogen storage disease (GSD)
- Glycogenic hepatopathy (Mauriac syndrome)

=== Drugs (including alcohol) ===
- Alcohol use disorder
- Drug-induced hepatitis

=== Congenital ===
- Hemolytic anemia
- Polycystic liver disease
- Sickle cell disease
- Hereditary fructose intolerance

=== Others ===
- Hunter syndrome (spleen affected)
- Zellweger's syndrome
- Carnitine palmitoyltransferase I deficiency
- Granulomatous: Sarcoidosis

== Mechanism ==
The mechanism of hepatomegaly consists of vascular swelling, inflammation (infectious in origin), and deposition of (1) non-hepatic cells or (2) increased cell contents (such as that due to iron in hemochromatosis or hemosiderosis and fat in fatty liver disease).

== Diagnosis ==
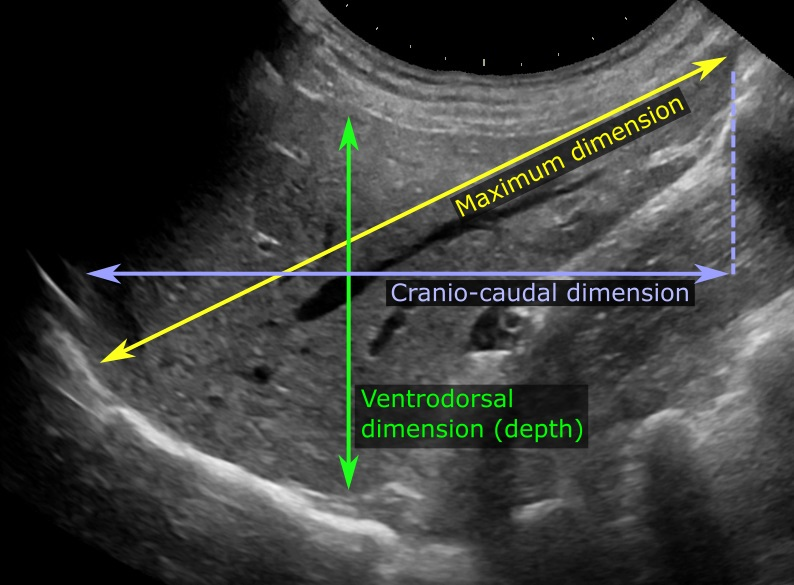
Abdominal ultrasonography of the liver, as a sagittal plane through the midclavicular line, with some standard measurements

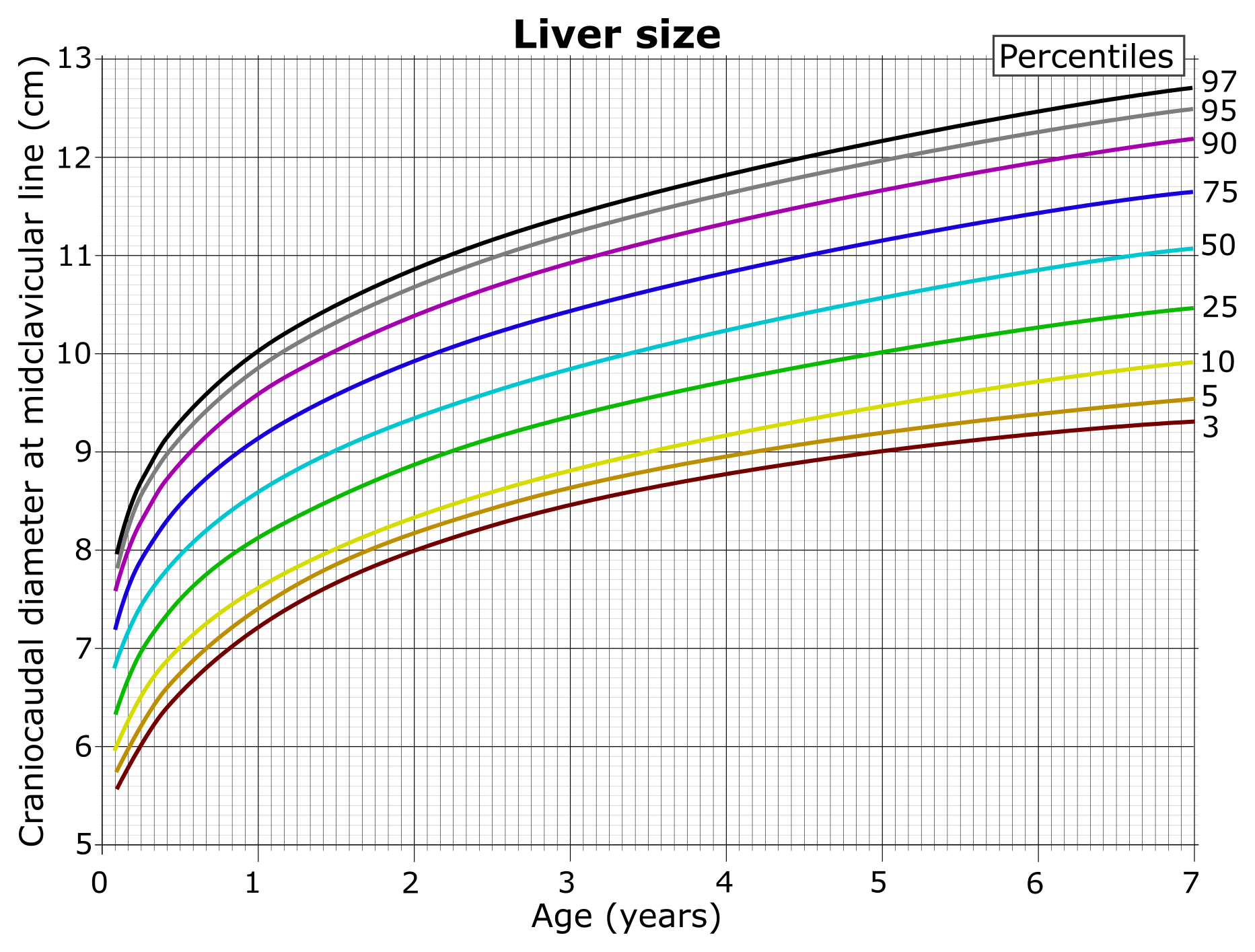
Right lobe of the liver at the midclavicular line at ages 0 to 7

Suspicion of hepatomegaly indicates a thorough medical history and physical examination, wherein the latter typically includes an increased liver span.

On abdominal ultrasonography, the liver can be measured by the maximum dimension on a sagittal plane view through the midclavicular line, which is normally up to 18 cm in adults. It is also possible to measure the cranio-caudal dimension, which is normally up to 15 cm in adults. This can be measured together with the ventro-dorsal dimension (or depth), which is normally up to 13 cm. Also, the caudate lobe is enlarged in many diseases. In the axial plane, the caudate lobe should normally have a cross-section of less than 0.55 of the rest of the liver.

Other ultrasound studies have suggested hepatomegaly as being defined as a longitudinal axis > 15.5 cm at the hepatic midline, or > 16.0 cm at the midclavicular line.

=== Workup ===
Blood tests should be done, especially liver-function tests, which give a good impression of the patient's broad metabolic picture.

A complete blood test can help distinguish intrinsic liver disease from extrahepatic bile-duct obstruction. An ultrasound of the liver can reliably detect a dilated biliary-duct system, it can also detect the characteristics of a cirrhotic liver.Computerized tomography (CT) can give accurate anatomical information for a complete diagnosis.

== Treatment ==
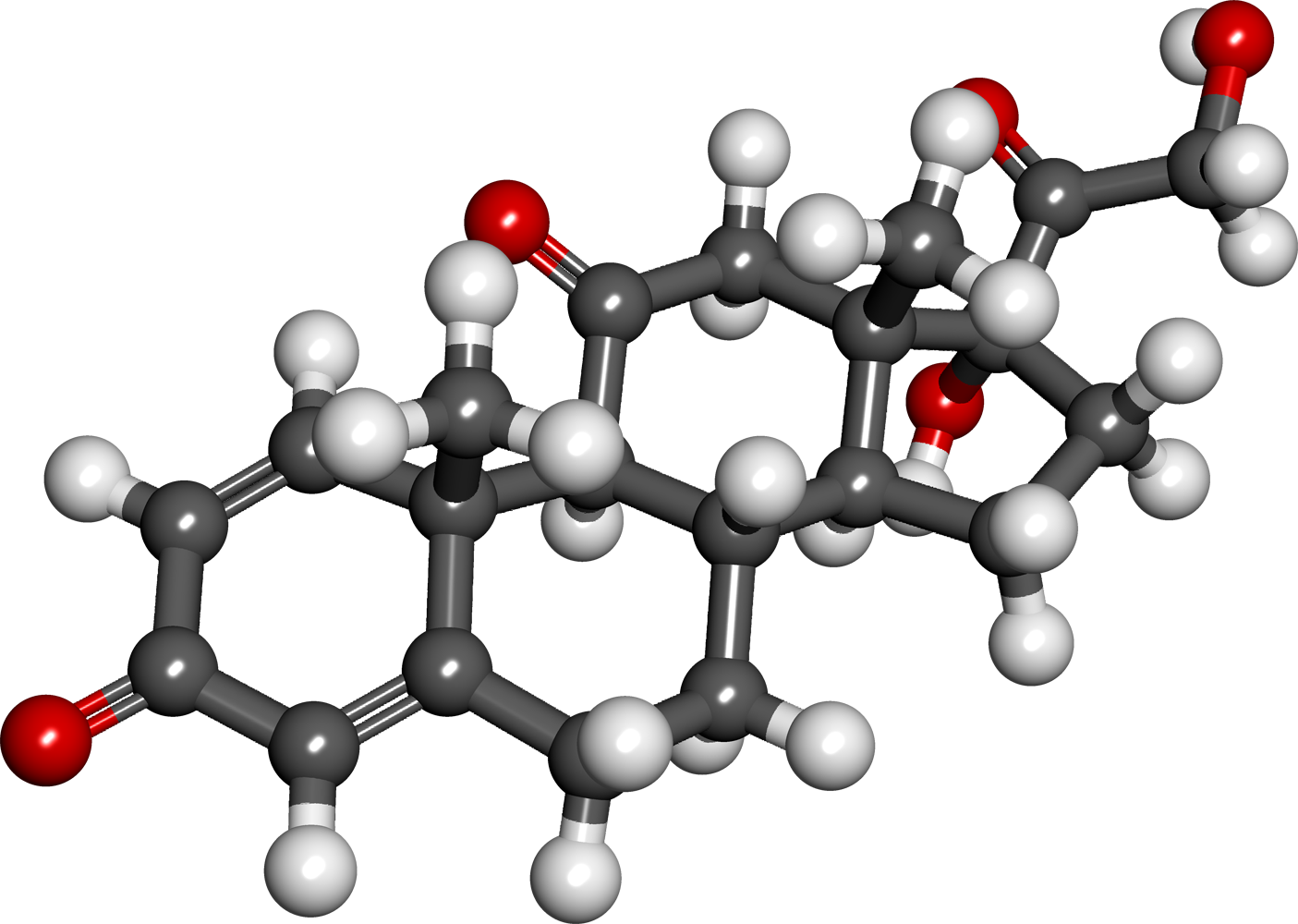
Prednisone

Treatment of hepatomegaly varies with the cause, so accurate diagnosis is the first concern. In auto-immune liver disease, prednisone and azathioprine may be used for treatment.

In lymphoma the treatment options include single-agent (or multi-agent) chemotherapy and regional radiotherapy, and surgery is an option in specific situations. Meningococcal group C conjugate vaccine is used in some cases.

In primary biliary cirrhosis, ursodeoxycholic acid helps the bloodstream remove bile, which may increase survival.

== See also ==
- Hepatosplenomegaly
- Liver function tests
