= Mauriac =

Mauriac may refer to:

== Medicine ==
- Mauriac syndrome, a complication of type 1 diabetes

== Places ==
- Mauriac, Cantal, in the Cantal département of France
- Mauriac, Gironde, in the Gironde département of France

== People with the surname ==
- Claude Mauriac (1914–1996), French writer and journalist, son of François
- François Mauriac (1885–1970), French writer, Nobel Prize in Literature in 1952
