= Parasternal line =

Line along the front of the thorax

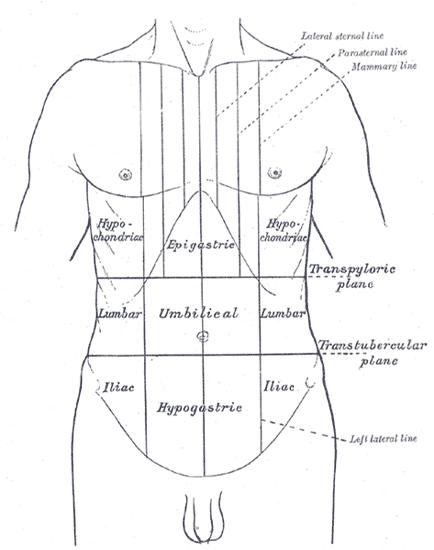
- Surface lines of the front of the thorax and abdomen.

Details

Identifiers
- Latin: linea parasternalis
- TA98: A01.2.00.014
- TA2: 62
- FMA: 20297

The parasternal line is a vertical line on the front of the thorax. It is midway between the lateral sternal line and the mid-clavicular line.
