= Glycogenic hepatopathy =

Complication of type 1 diabetes

- Other names: Mauriac syndrome
- Diagnostic method: Liver biopsy

Glycogenic hepatopathy(also known as Mauriac syndrome) is a rare complication of type 1 diabetes characterized by extreme liver enlargement due to glycogen deposition, along with growth failure and delayed puberty. It occurs in some children and adolescents with type 1 diabetes irrespective of their glycemic control.

== Signs and symptoms ==
Patients with Mauriac syndrome may present with obesity, hepatomegaly, cushingoid facies, and elevated liver enzymes. Patients usually have growth failure and delayed puberty, which should warn the physician about insufficient management of the patient's diabetes. These symptoms can be reversed with good glycemic control.

== Genetics ==
Abnormally high blood sugar levels are relatively common among patients with type I diabetes, but Mauriac syndrome is rare. This suggests that high blood sugar is not the only factor necessary to cause the syndrome. A study of an adolescent boy with severe Mauriac syndrome found a mutation in PHKG2, which is the catalytic subunit of the enzyme glycogen phosphorylase kinase (PhK). PhK is a large enzyme complex responsible for the activation of glycogen phosphorylase, the first enzyme in the pathway of glycogen metabolism. This child's mutation inhibited glycogen metabolism and caused increased glycogen deposition in the liver. The child's mother had the mutant enzyme, but no liver enlargement. The child's father had type 1 diabetes. Neither parent had Mauriac syndrome. The study suggests that both the mutant enzyme and an abnormally high blood glucose level were necessary to cause Mauriac syndrome.

== Diagnosis ==
In terms of the diagnosis of this condition (diabetic complication) we find the following is done:

- Liver biopsy
- Ultrasound
- CT scan

== Treatment ==
Symptoms are improved when patient attain tighter control of their blood sugars. The generally accepted therapeutic approach is intensified multiple insulin injection therapy; however, this may cause development of retinopathy if the blood sugars are adjusted too quickly. In one study, a patient was transferred to continuous insulin delivery, which resulted in improvement of his symptoms and greater control of his blood sugars.

== History ==
Mauriac syndrome was first described in 1930 by Pierre Mauriac. It was described as a syndrome of growth failure and delayed puberty in children with poorly-controlled type I diabetes.
