= Scapular line =

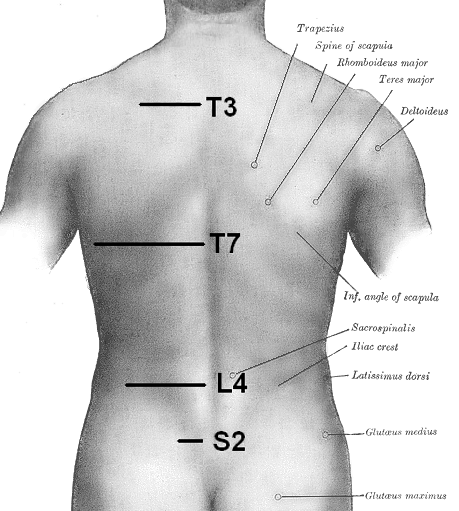
- Surface anatomy of the back. (Inferior angle of scapula labeled at bottom center.)

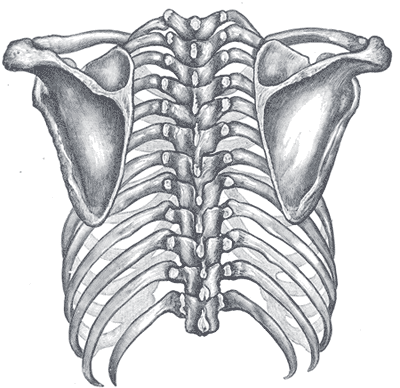
- Posterior view of the thorax and shoulder girdle.

Details

Identifiers
- Latin: linea scapularis
- TA98: A01.2.00.020
- TA2: 68
- FMA: 14613

The scapular line, also known as the midscapular line or linea scapularis, is a vertical line passing through the inferior angle of the scapula.

It has been used in the evaluation of brachial plexus birth palsy.
