= List of anatomical lines =

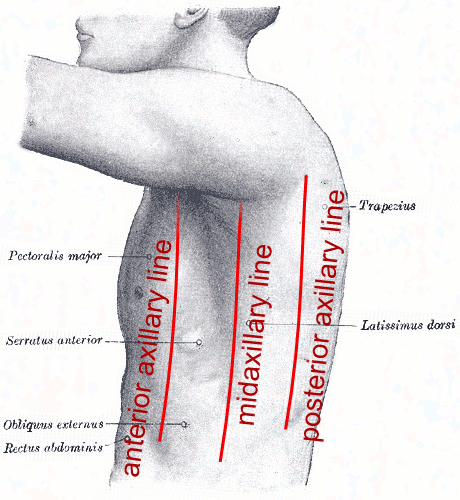
Axillary lines.

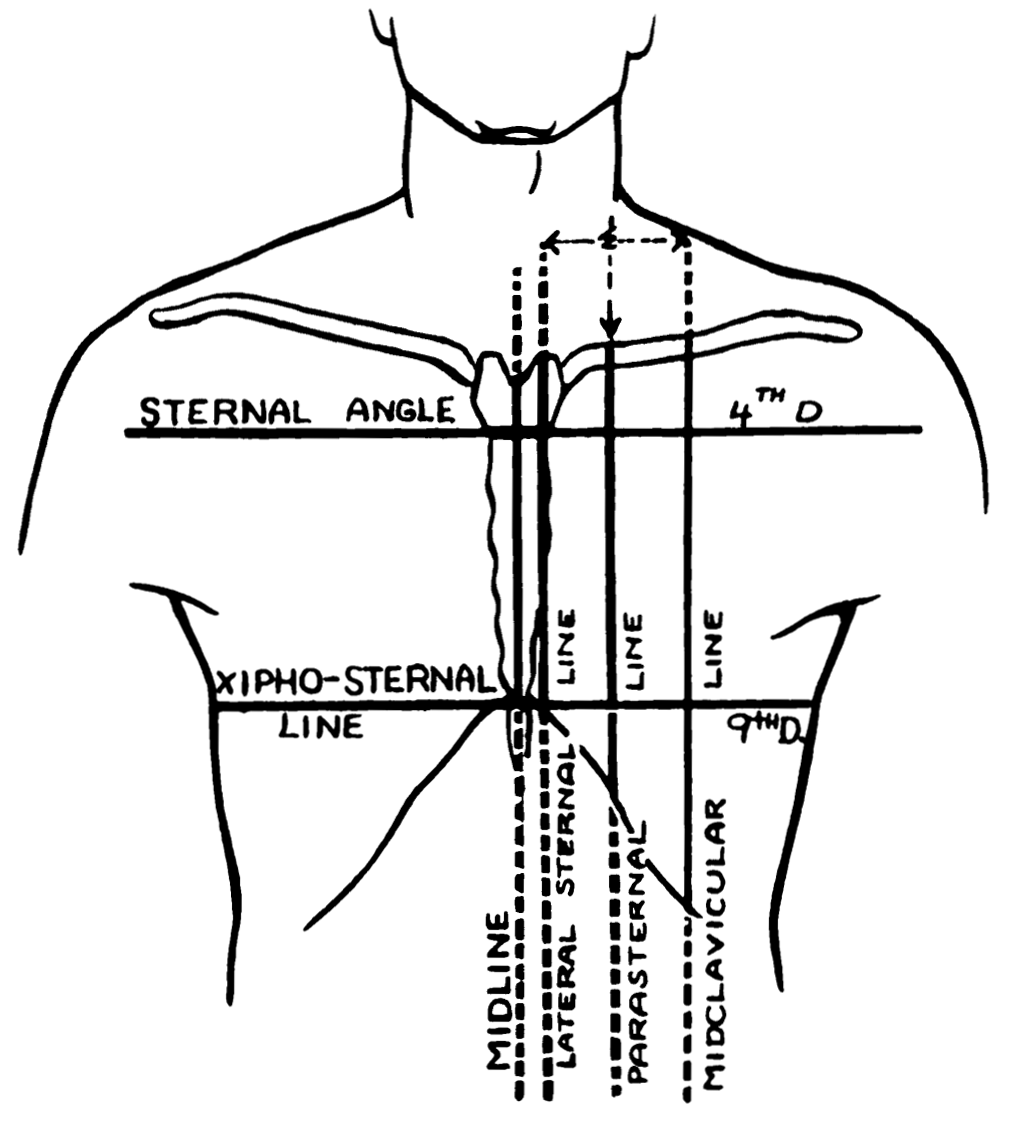
Vertical lines: Midline, lateral sternal line, parasternal line and midclavicular line. Horizontal lines: Level of the sternal angle, and zipho-sternal line.

Anatomical lines, or "reference lines," are theoretical lines drawn through anatomical structures and are used to describe anatomical location. The following reference lines are identified in Terminologia Anatomica:

- Anterior median line
- Lateral sternal line: A vertical line corresponding to the lateral margin of the sternum.
- Parasternal line: A vertical line equidistant from the sternal and mid-clavicular lines.
- Mid-clavicular line: A vertical line passing through the midpoint of the clavicle.
- Mammillary line
- Anterior axillary line: A vertical line on the anterior torso marked by the anterior axillary fold.
- Midaxillary line: A vertical line passing through the apex of the axilla.
- Posterior axillary line: A vertical line passing through the posterior axillary fold.
- Scapular line: A vertical line passing through the inferior angle of the scapula.
- Paravertebral line: A vertical line corresponding to the tips of the transverse processes of the vertebrae.
- Posterior median line

Other anatomical lines include:

- Mid-pupillary line: A line running vertically down the face through the midpoint of the pupil when looking directly forward.
- Mid-inguinal point: A point midway between the anterior superior iliac spine and the pubic symphysis.
- Intercristal line: A transverse line passing across the lumbar spine between the superior aspects of the iliac crests.
- Mid-dorsal line: The intersection between the dorsal skin and the median plane.
- Mid-ventral line: The intersection between the ventral skin and the median plane.

== See also ==
- Axillary lines
- Anatomical plane
