= Abdominal ultrasonography =

Type of medical scan

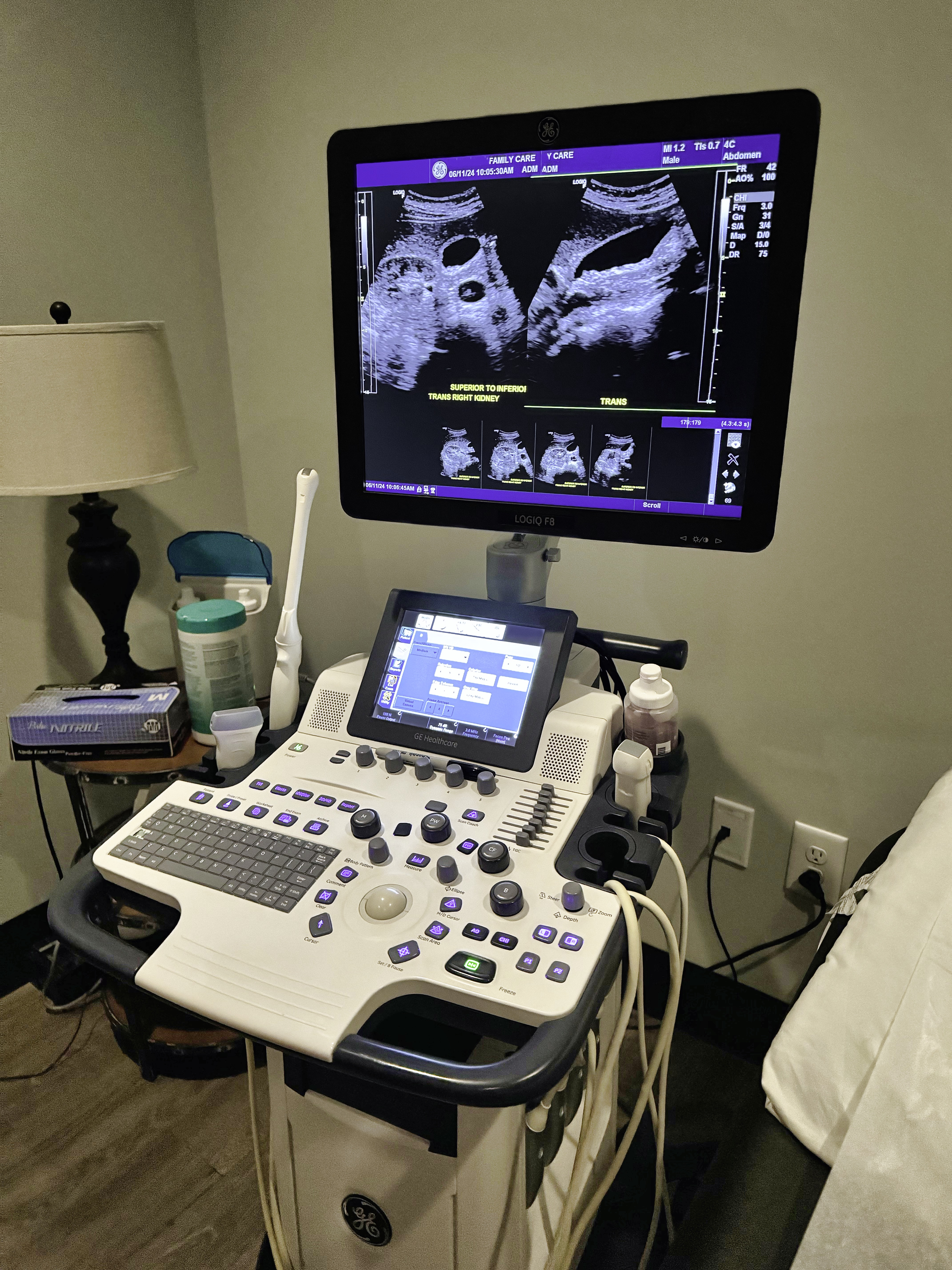
- Medical ultrasound equipment which can be used for abdominal ultrasonography
- ICD-9-CM: 88.76
- OPS-301 code: 3-059
- MedlinePlus: 003777

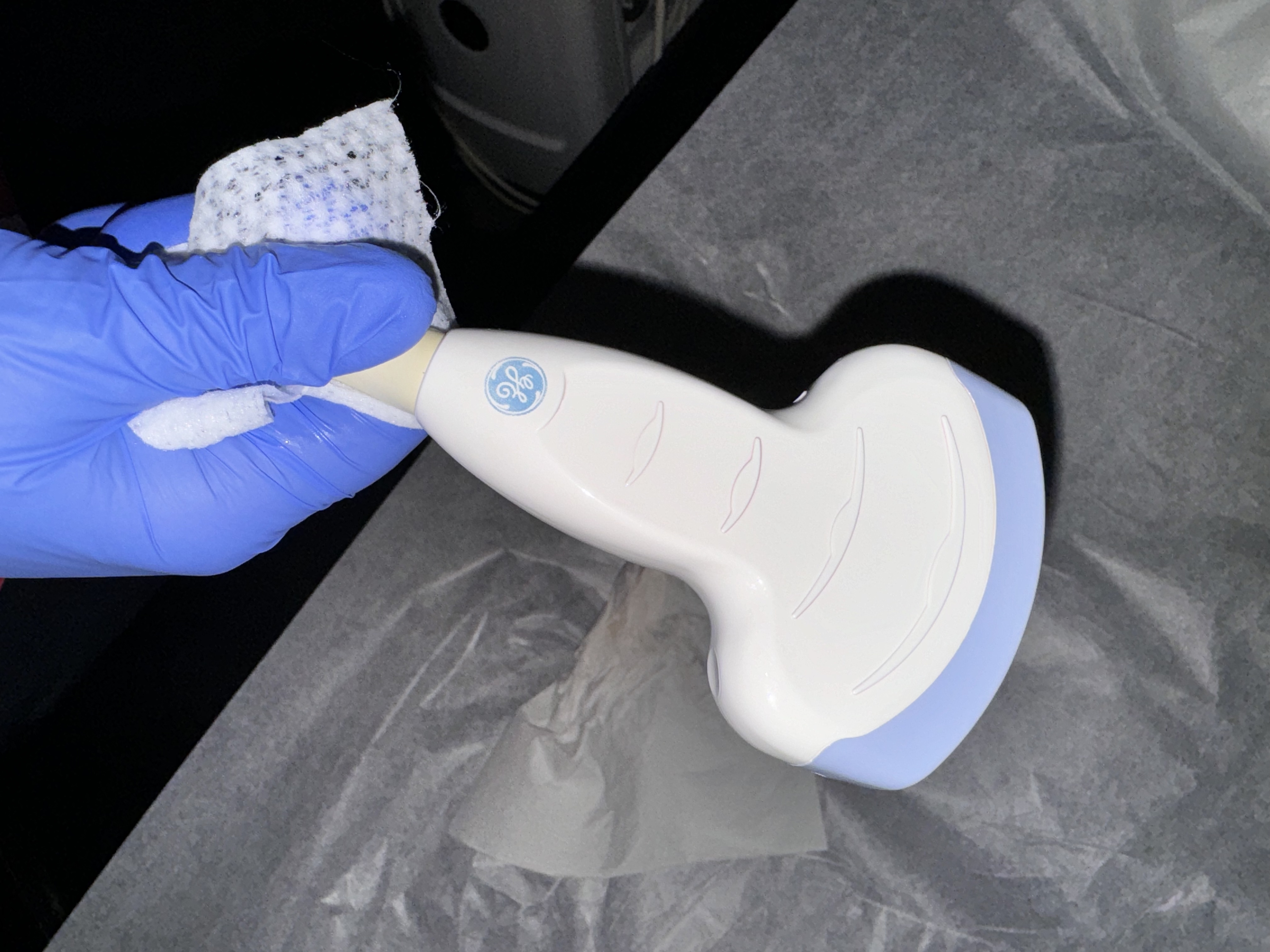
Ultrasound probe (curvilinear type) is used for examination of superficial structures.

Abdominal ultrasonography (also called abdominal ultrasound imaging or abdominal sonography) is a form of medical ultrasonography (medical application of ultrasound technology) to visualise abdominal anatomical structures. It uses transmission and reflection of ultrasound waves to visualise internal organs through the abdominal wall (with the help of gel, which helps transmission of the sound waves). For this reason, the procedure is also called a transabdominal ultrasound, in contrast to endoscopic ultrasound, the latter combining ultrasound with endoscopy through visualize internal structures from within hollow organs.

Abdominal ultrasound examinations are performed by gastroenterologists or other specialists in internal medicine, radiologists, or sonographers trained for this procedure.

== Medical uses ==
Abdominal ultrasound can be used to diagnose abnormalities in various internal organs, such as the kidneys, liver, gallbladder, pancreas, spleen and abdominal aorta. If Doppler ultrasonography is added, the blood flow inside blood vessels can be evaluated as well (for example, to look for renal artery stenosis). It is commonly used to examine the uterus and fetus during pregnancy; this is called obstetric ultrasonography.

Abdominal ultrasound is commonly used in the setting of abdominal pain or an acute abdomen (sudden and/or severe abdominal pain syndrome in which surgical intervention might be necessary), in which it can diagnose appendicitis or cholecystitis.

Ultrasound can also be used if there is suspicion of enlargement of one or more organs, such as used in screening for abdominal aortic aneurysm, investigation for splenomegaly or urinary retention.

Ultrasound can be used for additional anatomical information for patients with an abnormal kidney function or pancreatic enzymes (pancreatic amylase and pancreatic lipase).

Standard measurement of the abdominal aorta

It can be used on the abdominal aorta to detect or exclude abdominal aortic aneurysm. For this purpose, the standard aortic measurement for abdominal aortic aneurysm is between the outer margins of the aortic wall.

In cases of infectious mononucleosis, splenomegaly is a common symptom, and health care providers may consider using abdominal ultrasonography to get insight into a person's condition. However, because spleen size varies greatly, ultrasonography is not a valid technique for assessing spleen enlargement and should not be used in typical circumstances or to make routine decisions about fitness for playing sports.

=== Detecting stones ===
Ultrasound imaging is useful for detecting stones, for example kidney stones or gallstones, because they create a clearly visible ultrasound shadow behind the stone.

Ultrasonography can be used to guide procedures such as treatment for kidney stones with extracorporeal shock wave lithotripsy, needle biopsies or paracentesis (needle drainage of free fluid inside the abdominal cavity).

=== Liver ===
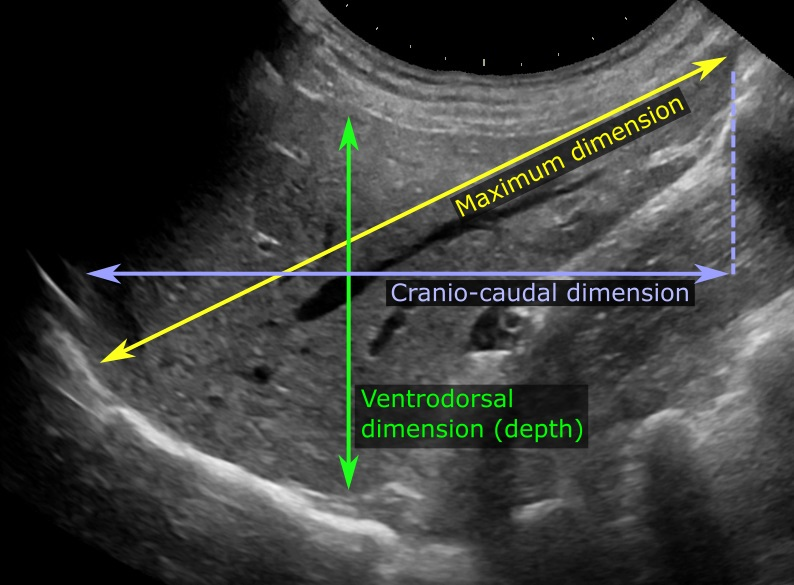
Ultrasonography of the liver with some standard measurements

In patients with deranged liver function tests, ultrasound may show increased liver size (hepatomegaly), increased reflectiveness (which might, for example, indicate cholestasis), gallbladder or bile duct diseases, or a tumor in the liver.

Ultrasonography of liver tumors involves two stages: detection and characterization. Tumor detection is based on the performance of the method and should include morphometric information (three axes dimensions, volume) and topographic information (number, location specifying liver segment and lobe/lobes). The specification of these data is important for staging liver tumors and prognosis. Tumor characterization is a complex process based on a sum of criteria leading towards tumor nature definition. Often, other diagnostic procedures, especially interventional ones, are no longer necessary. Tumor characterization using the ultrasound method will be based on the following elements: consistency (solid, liquid, mixed), echogenicity, structure appearance (homogeneous or heterogeneous), delineation from adjacent liver parenchyma (capsular, imprecise), elasticity, posterior acoustic enhancement effect, the relation with neighboring organs or structures (displacement, invasion), vasculature (presence and characteristics on Doppler ultrasonography and contrast-enhanced ultrasound (CEUS).

=== Renal ultrasonography ===
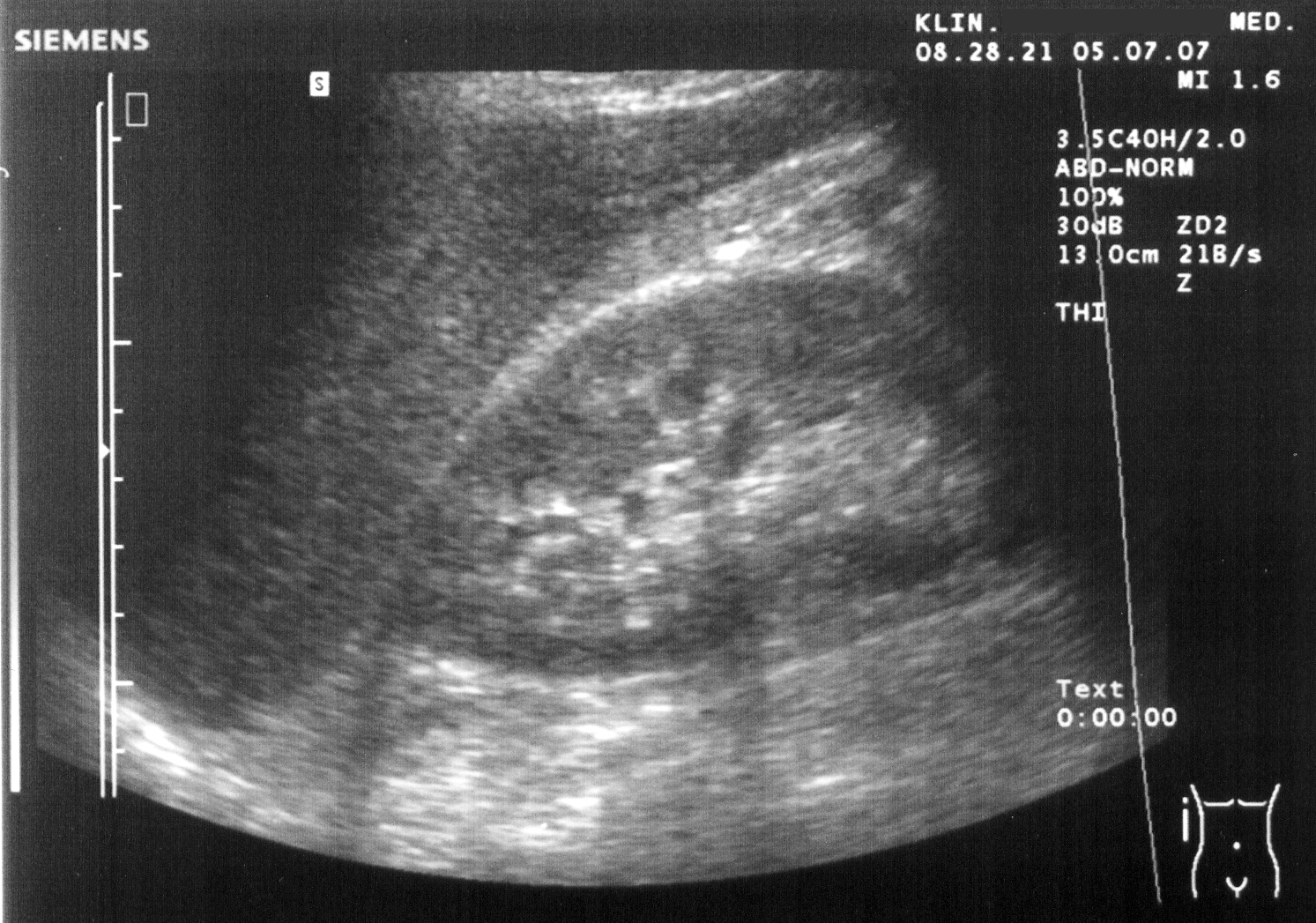
Ultrasound scan of a kidney (right side)

Ultrasonography of the kidneys is essential in the diagnosis and management of kidney-related diseases. The kidneys are easily examined, and most pathological changes in the kidneys are distinguishable with ultrasound.

== Technique ==
Advantages of ultrasound imaging of abdominal structures are that the procedure can be performed quickly, bed-side, involves no exposure to X-rays (which makes it useful in pregnant patients, for example) and is inexpensive compared to other often-used techniques such as computed tomography (CT scan) of the abdomen. Disadvantages are troublesome imaging if a lot of gas is present inside the bowels, if there is a lot of abdominal fat, and that the quality of the imaging depends on the experience of the person performing it.

The imaging occurs real-time and without sedation, so that the influence of movements can be assessed quickly. For example, by pressing the ultrasound probe against the gallbladder, a radiological Murphy's sign can be elicited.

Through the abdominal wall, organs inside the pelvis can be seen, such as the urinary bladder or the ovaries and uterus in women. Because water is an excellent conductor for ultrasound waves, visualizing these structures often requires a well-filled urinary bladder (this means the patients has to drink plenty of water before the examination).

The liver can be imaged by swiping the probe sagittally from medial to lateral at the subcoastal region. However, if majority of the liver parenchyma is located high up in behind the ribs, the subject can be asked to breathe deeply to push down the liver into the abdomen for better visibility of liver. If the liver is still not visualised, then the subject can be rolled to the left lateral position to move the liver out of the ribs. Then, the ultrasound probe is rotated 90 degrees to access the liver in axial plane from the dome of the diaphragm until the lower segment of the liver.

== Abdominal Ultrasound (Full Exam) ==
STRUCTURED REPORT

(Technique: Transabdominal ultrasonography; Device: Toshiba Aplio XG)

Liver: Diffusely homogeneous and normal in echogenicity. No focal mass or contour nodularity. No intrahepatic biliary ductal dilatation.
Portal Vein: Patent main portal vein.
Gallbladder: No stones, wall thickening, or pericholecystic fluid.
Common Bile Duct: Nondilated measuring 1.3 mm at the level of the porta hepatis.
Pancreas: Visualized portions unremarkable.
Spleen: Normal in size.
Kidneys: Right and left kidneys measure 11.5 cm and 12 cm in length respectively. No hydronephrosis. Small left lower pole kidney cyst.
Ascites: None.
Aorta: Visualized portions normal in caliber, 16 x 15 mm.
IVC: Normal.

IMPRESSION:
Normal abdominal ultrasound.

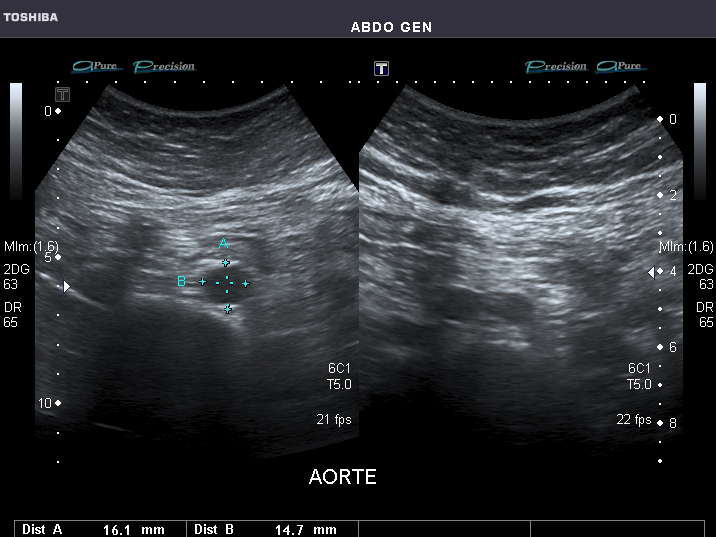
Aorta

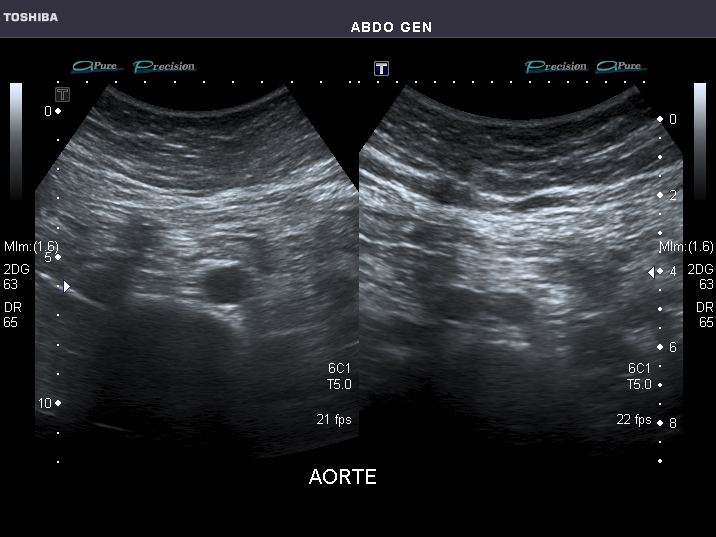
Aorta

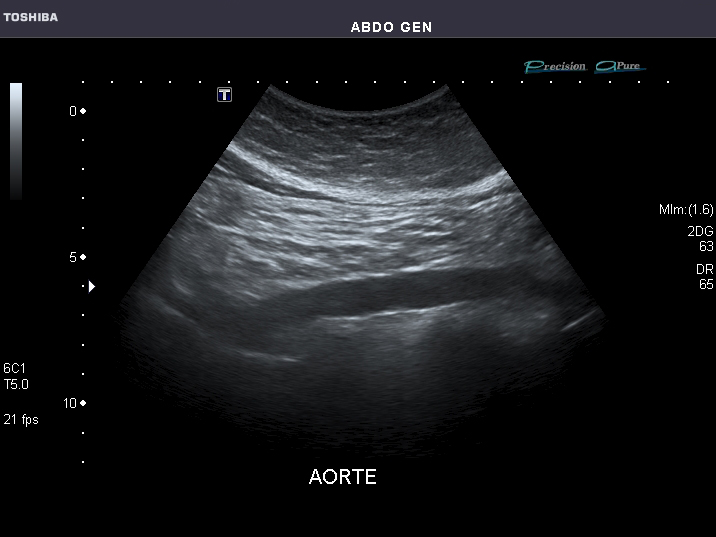
Aorta

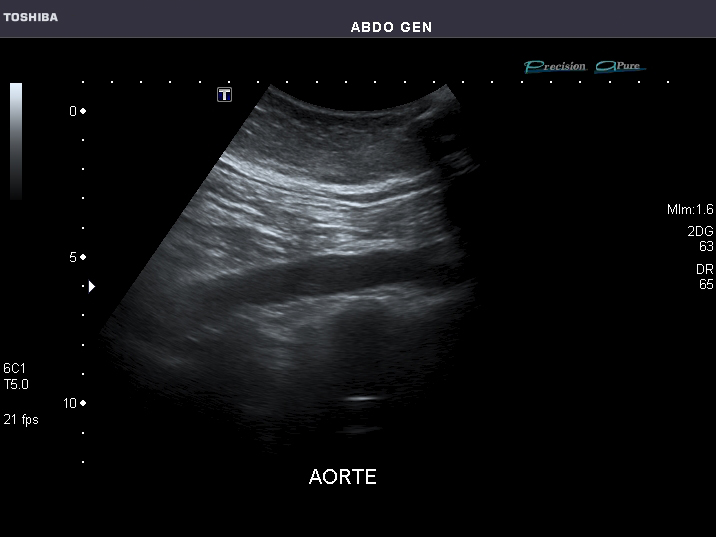
Aorta

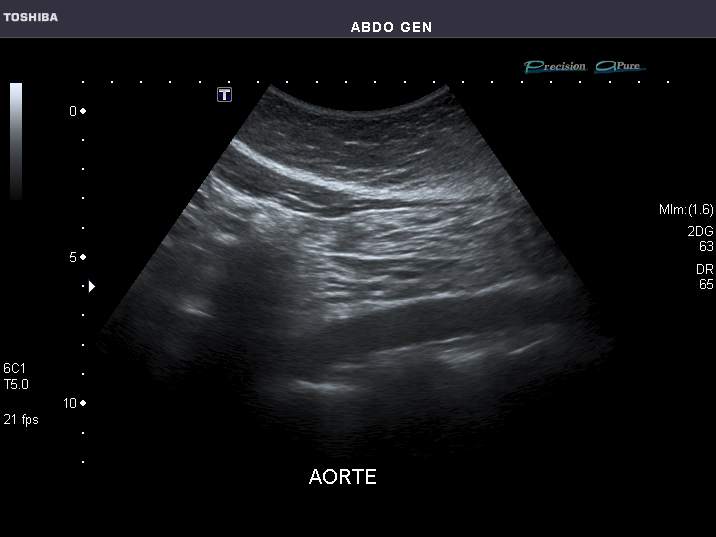
Aorta

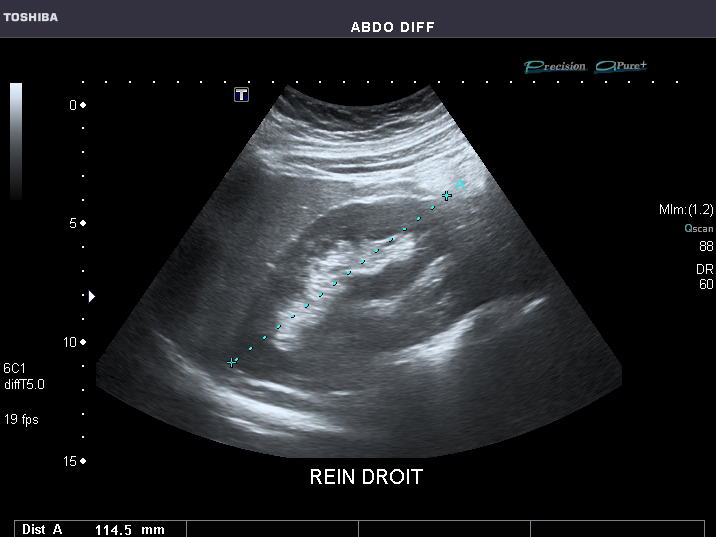
Right kidney

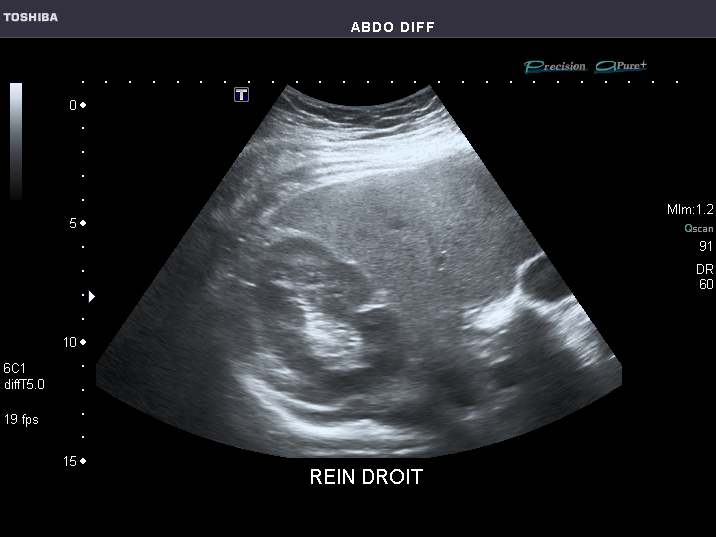
Right kidney

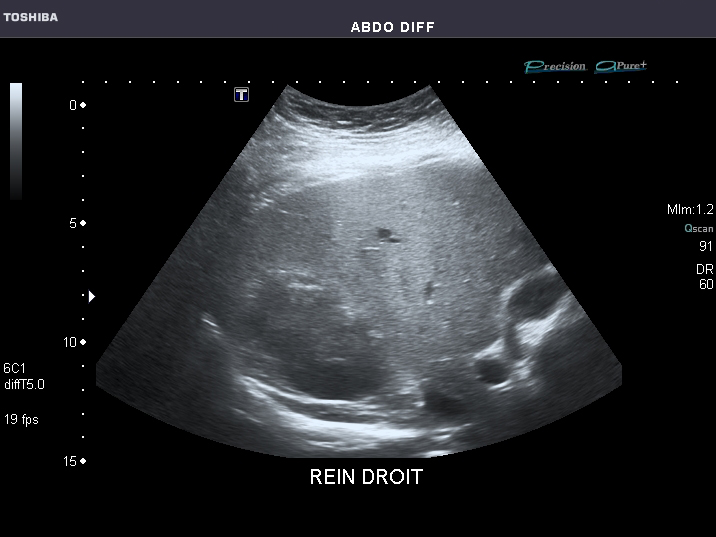
Right kidney

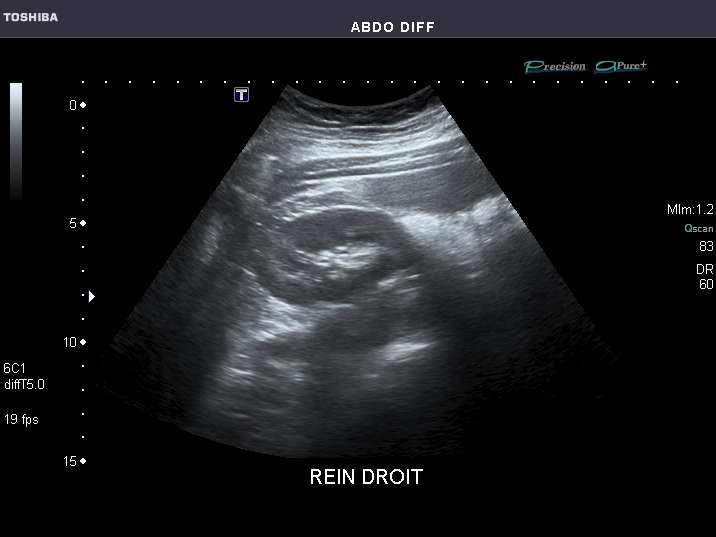
Right kidney

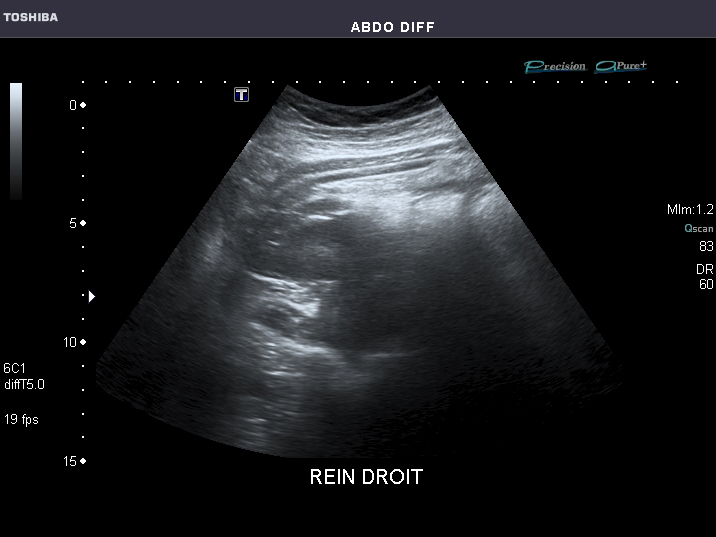
Right kidney

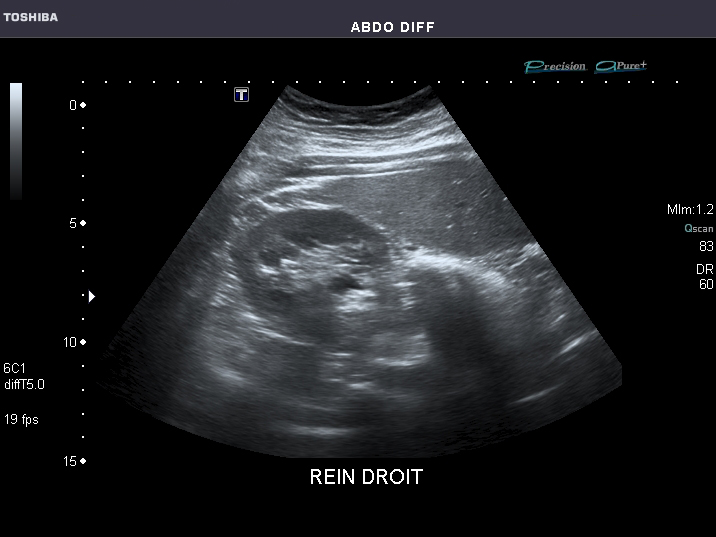
Right kidney

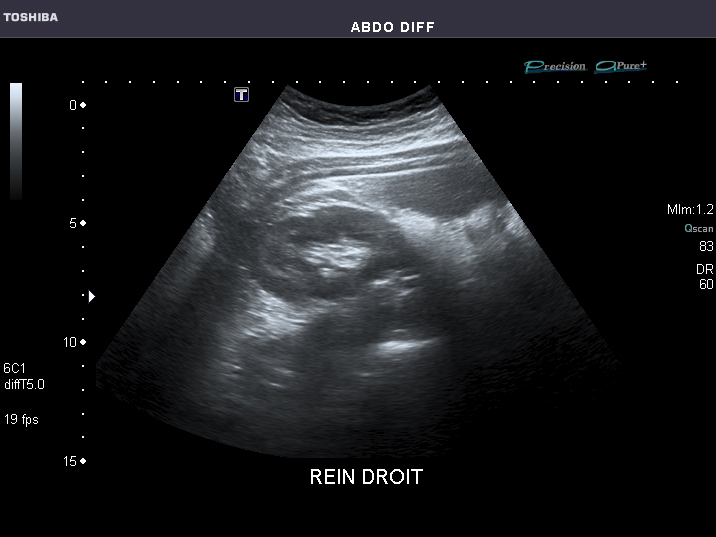
Right kidney

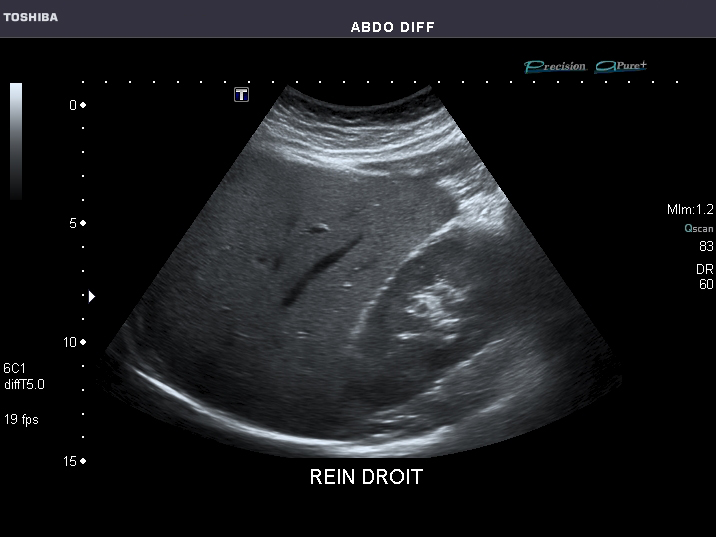
Right kidney

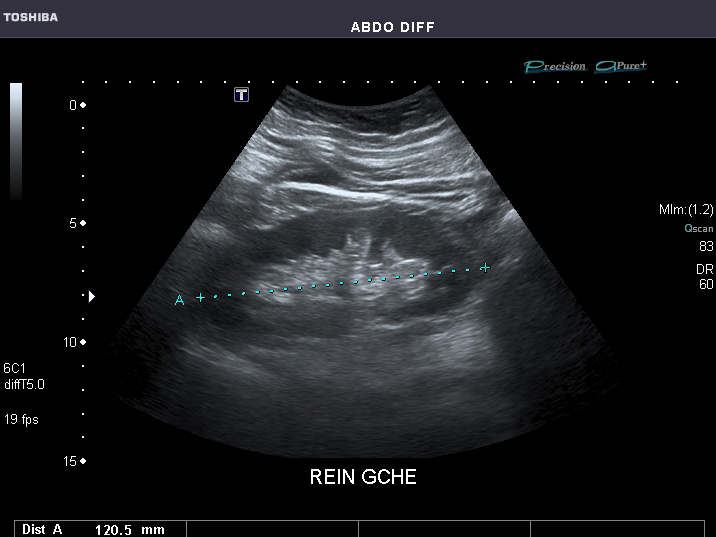
Left kidney

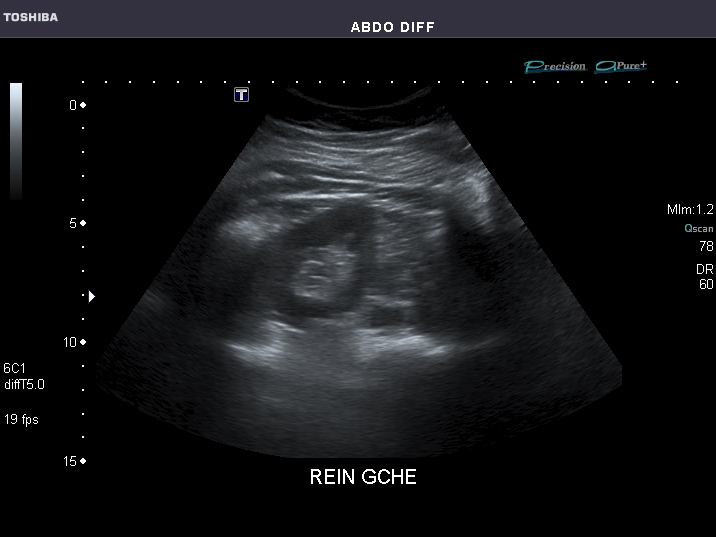
Left kidney

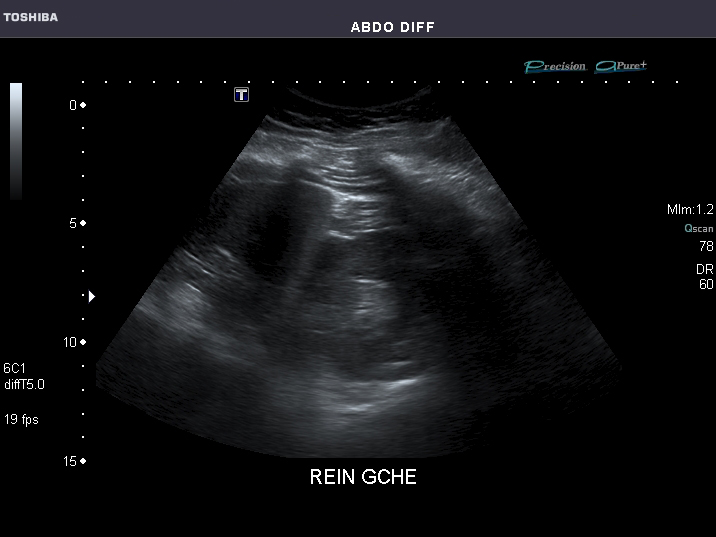
Left kidney

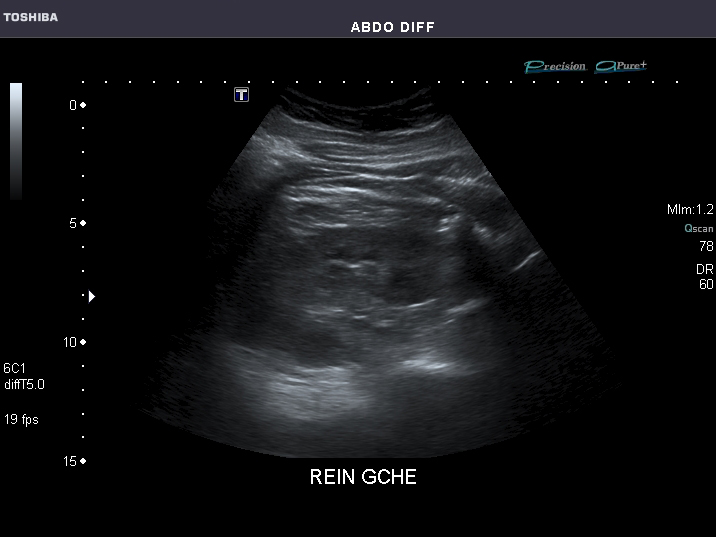
Left kidney

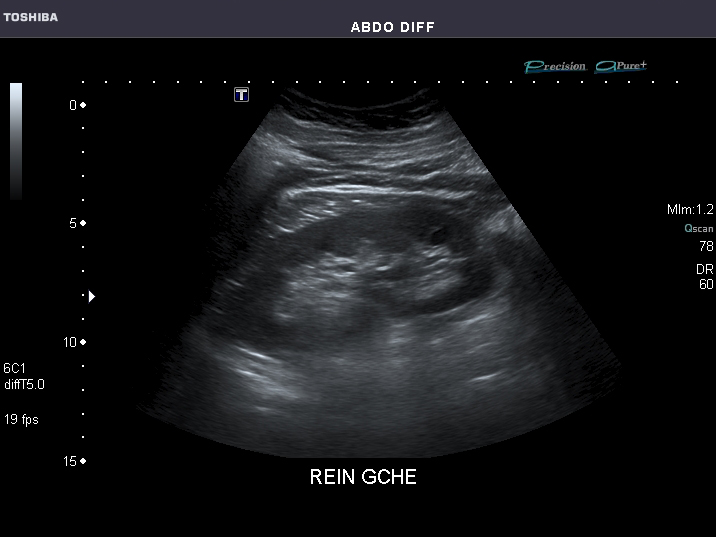
Left kidney

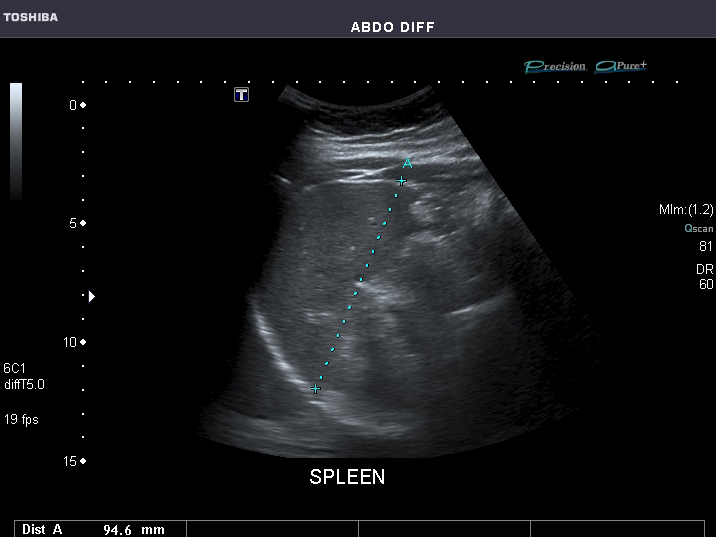
Spleen

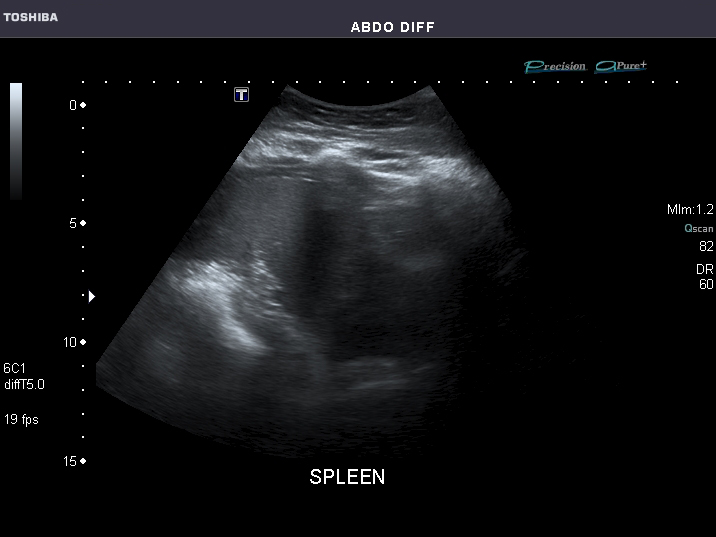
Spleen

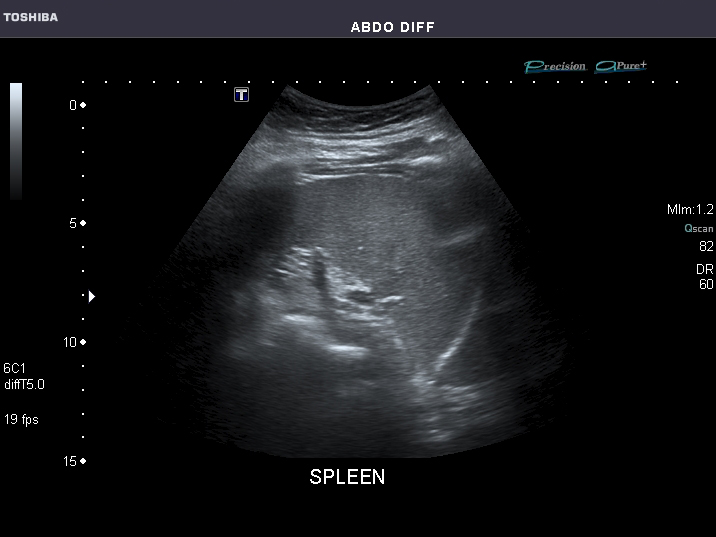
Spleen

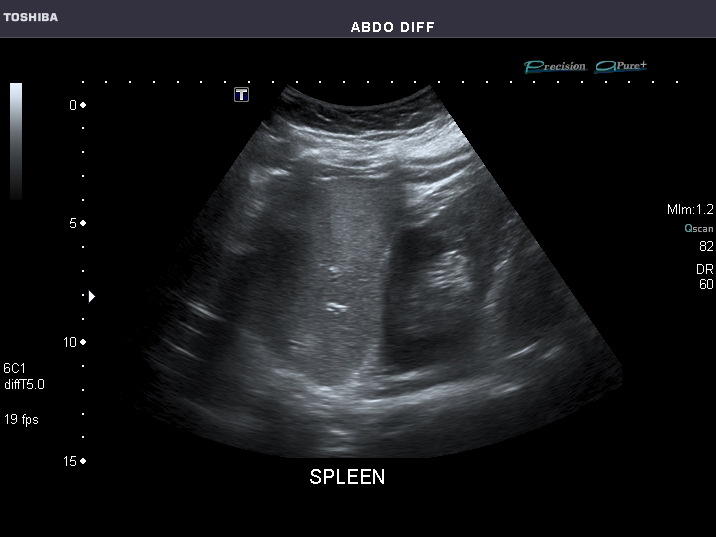
Spleen

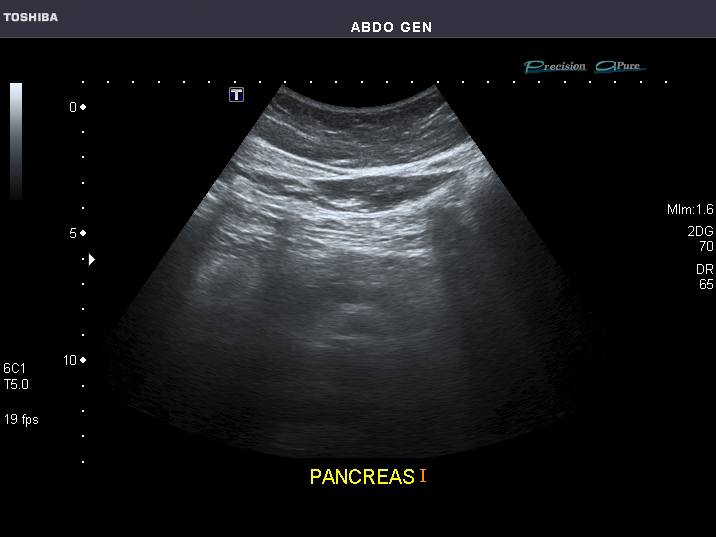
Pancreas

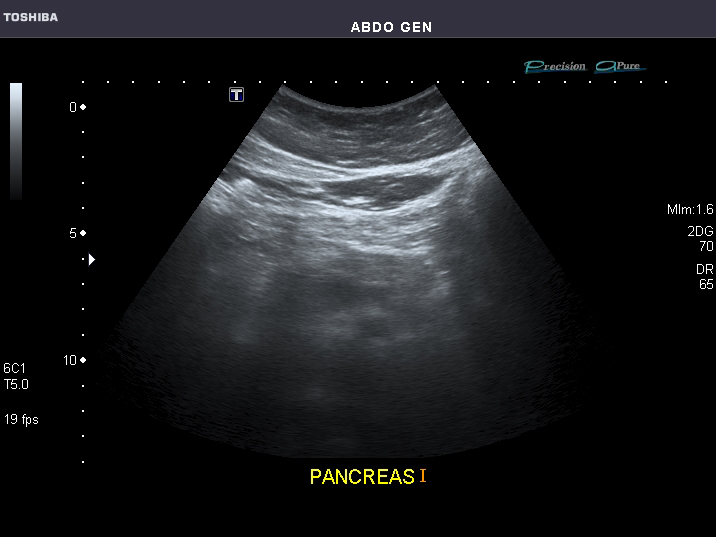
Pancreas

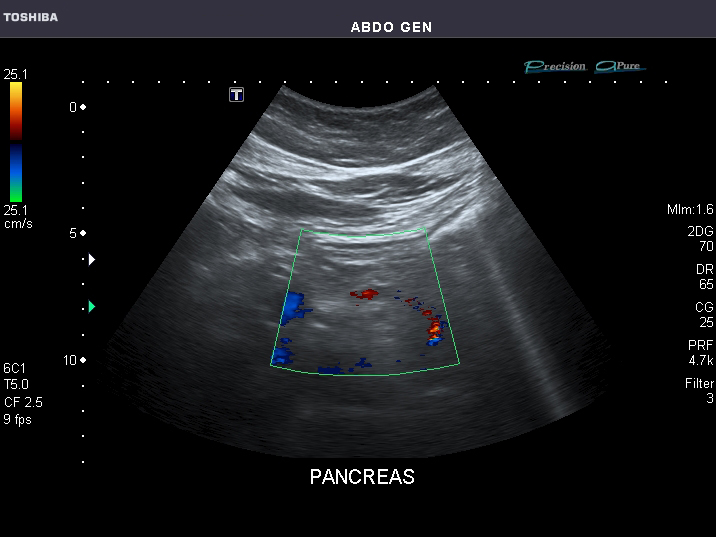
Pancreas

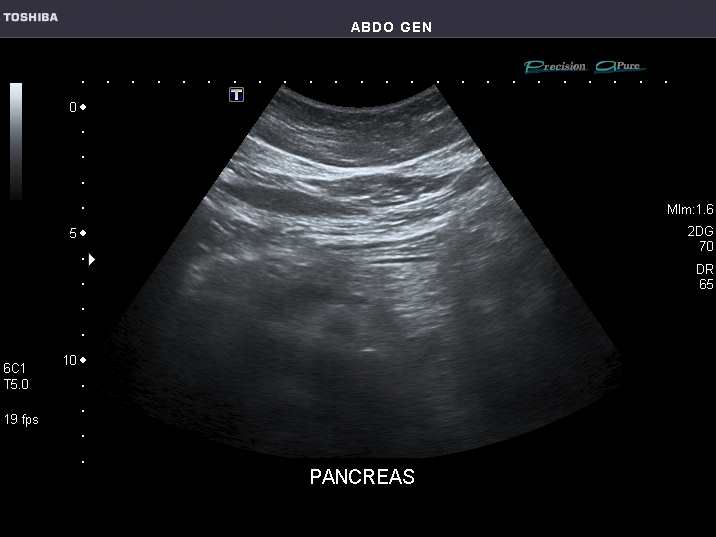
Pancreas

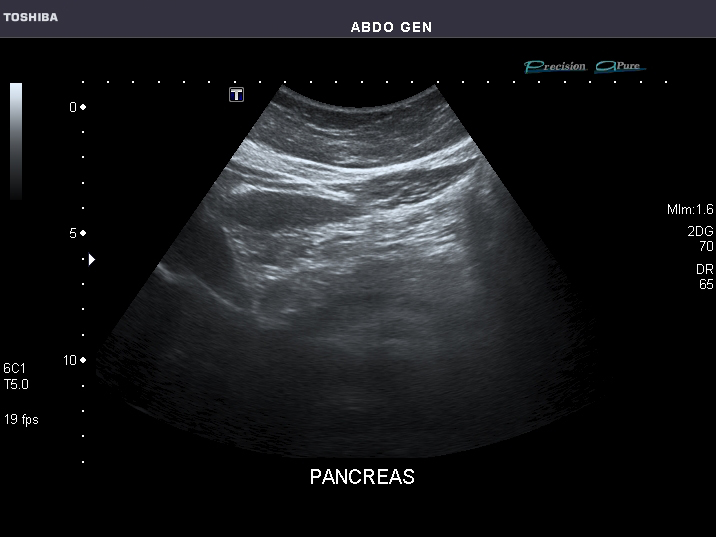
Pancreas

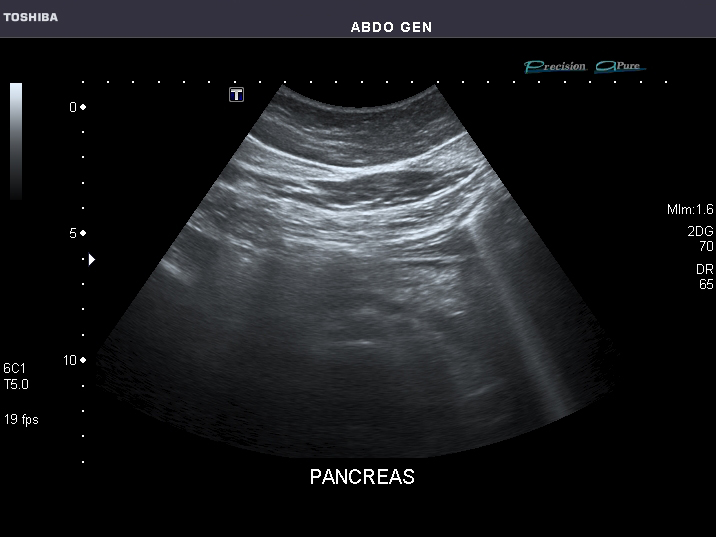
Pancreas

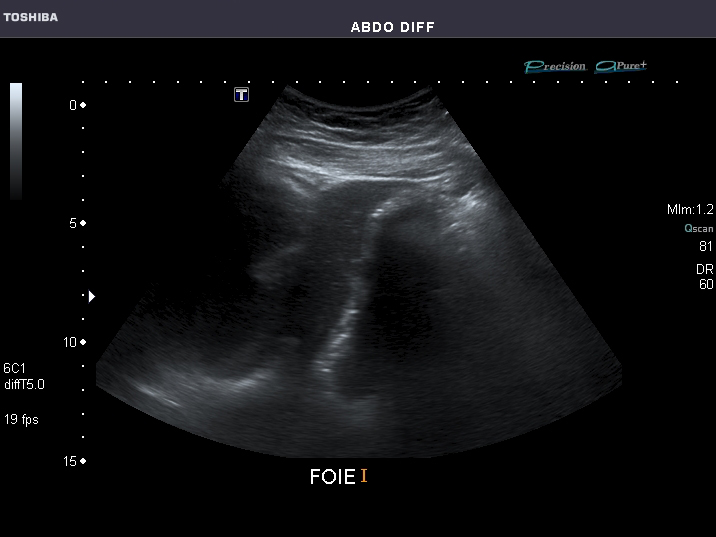
Liver

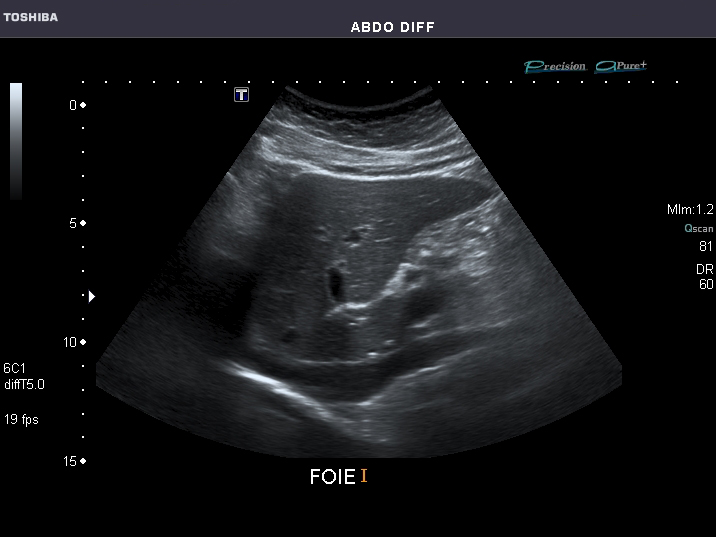
Liver

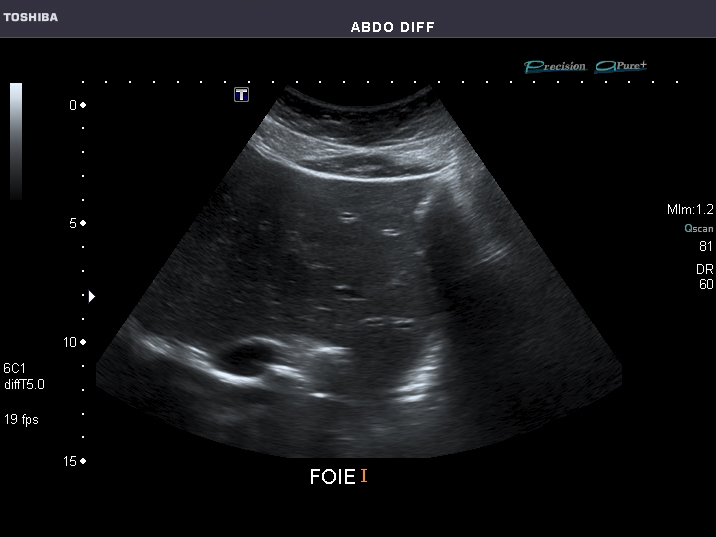
Liver

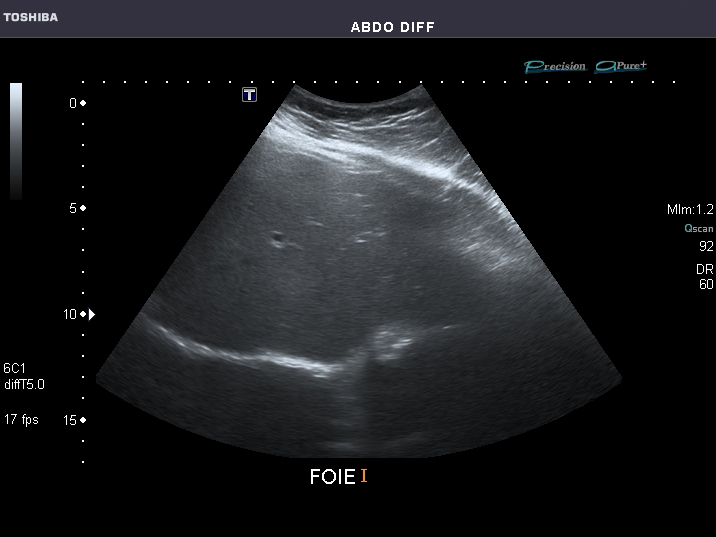
Liver

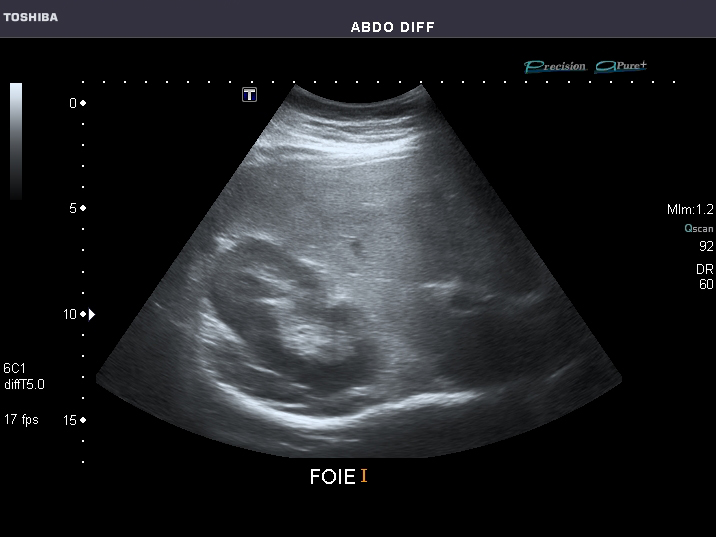
Liver

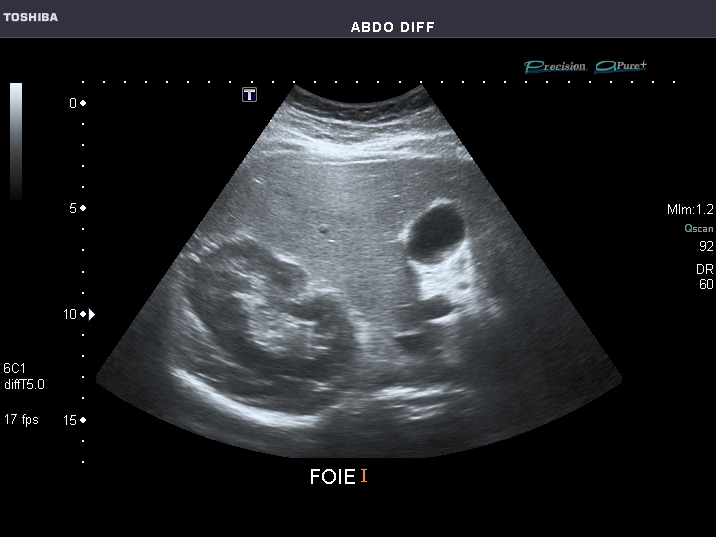
Liver

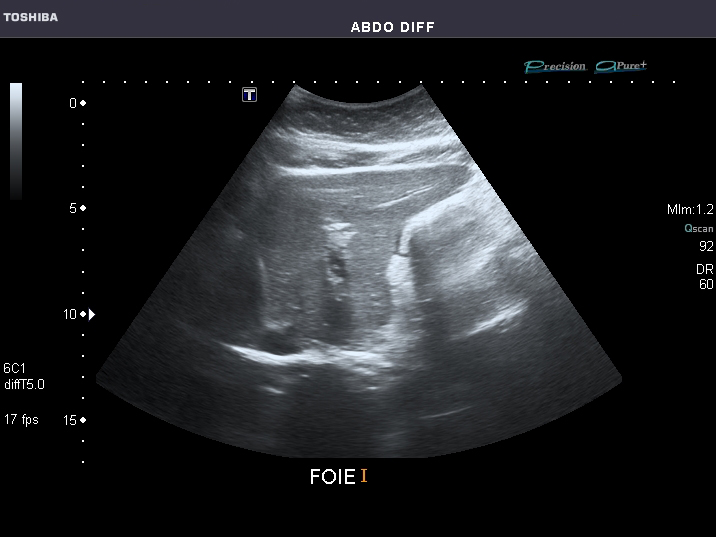
Liver

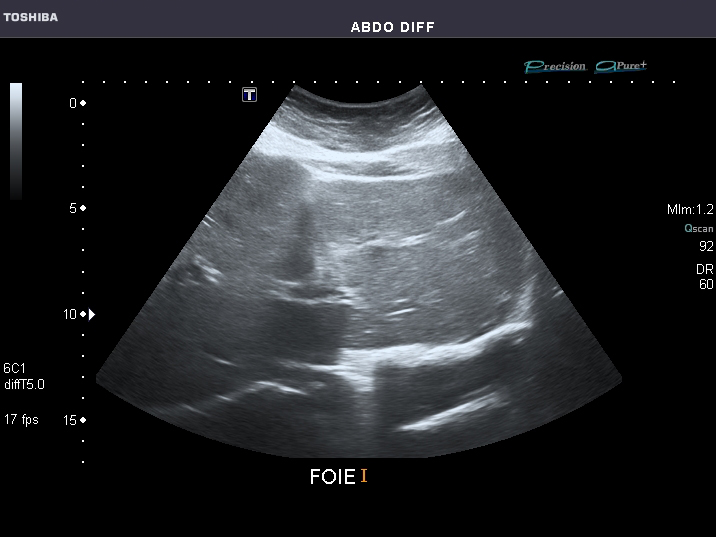
Liver

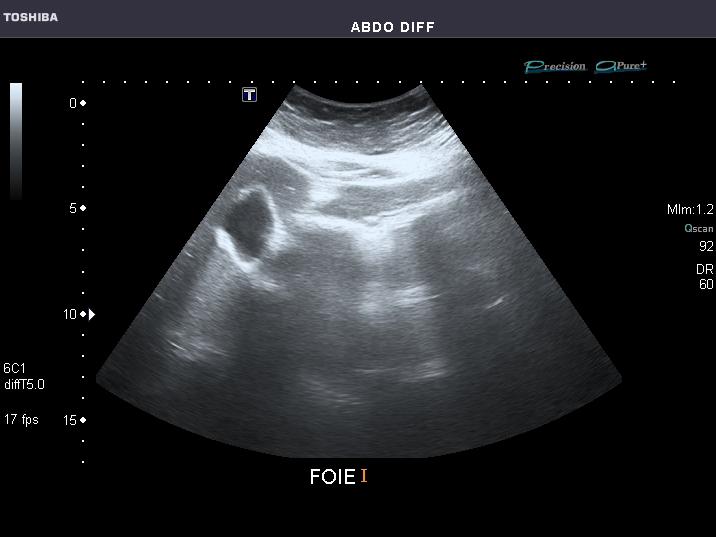
Liver

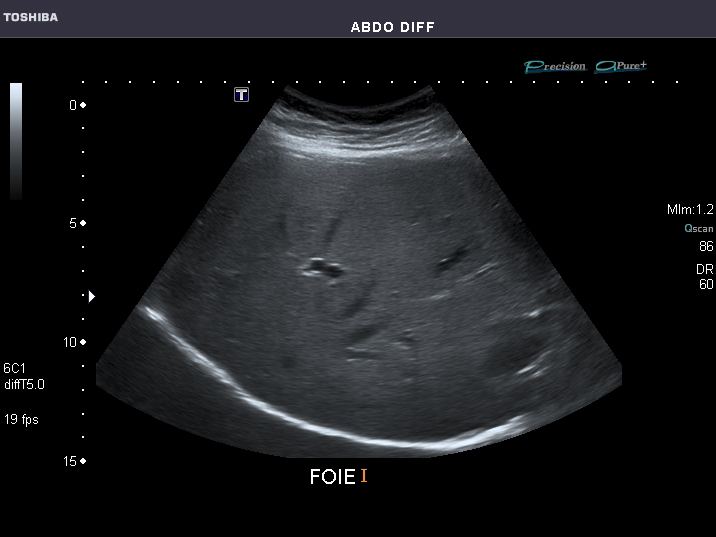
Liver

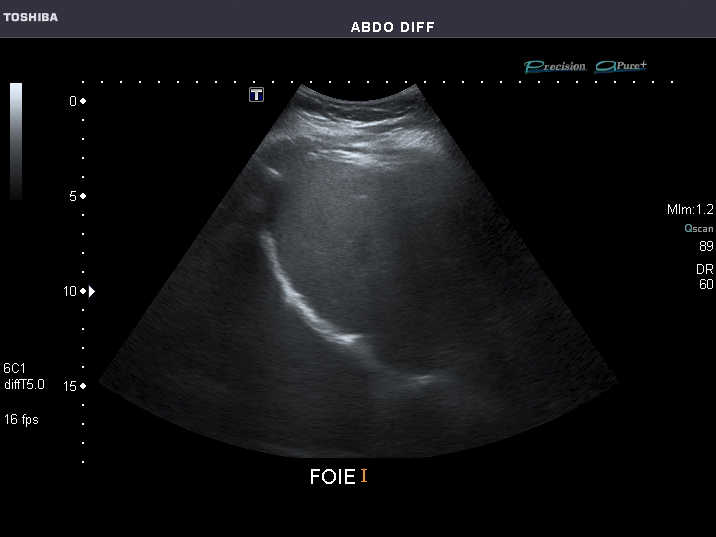
Liver

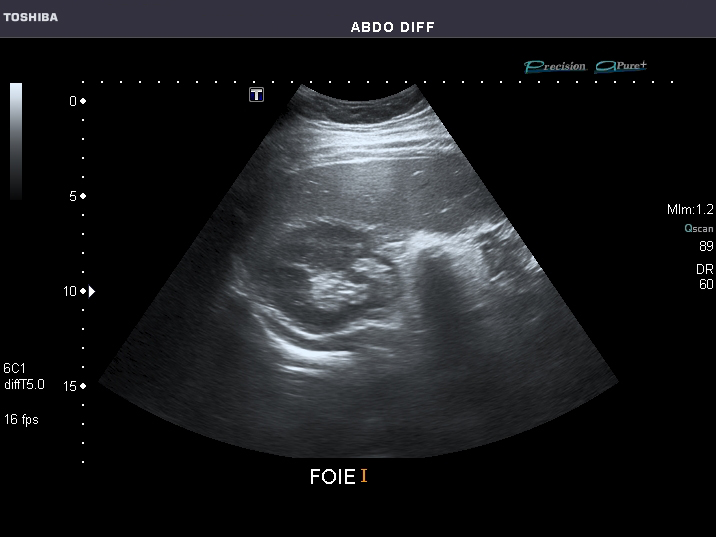
Liver

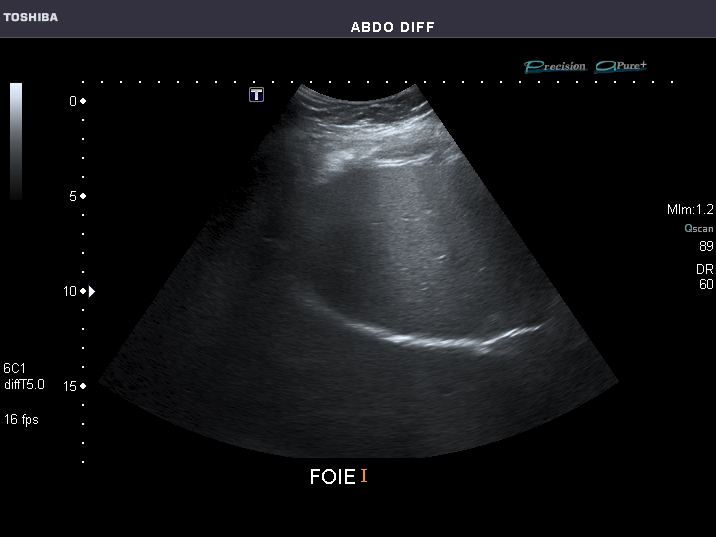
Liver

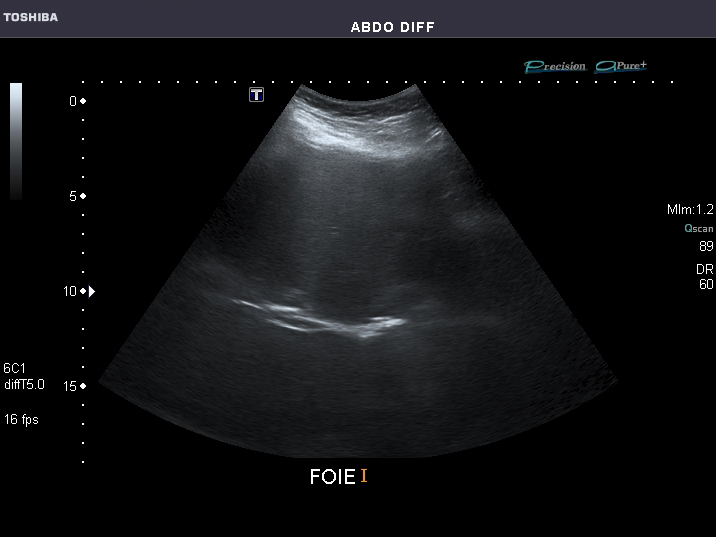
Liver

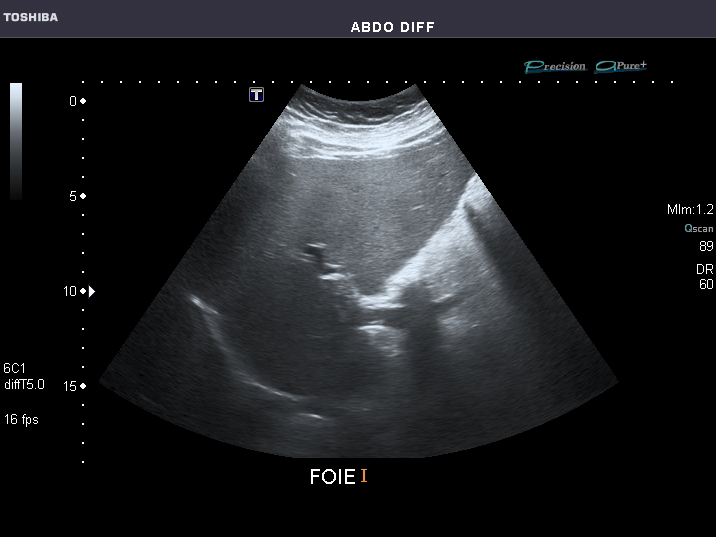
Liver

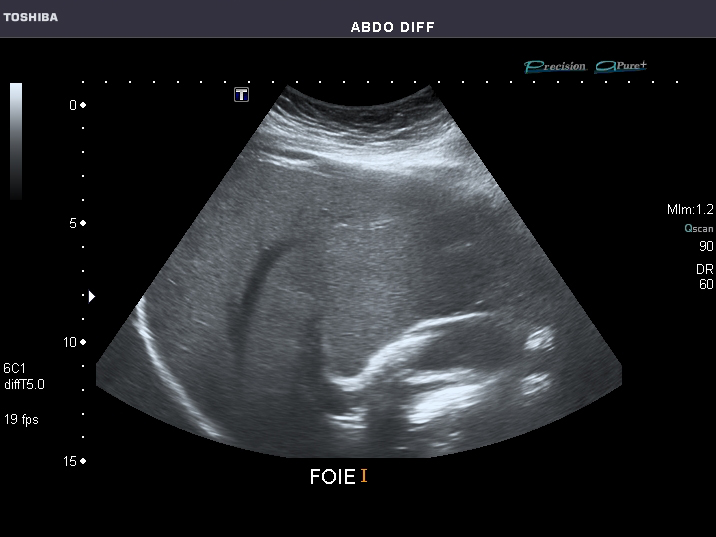
Liver

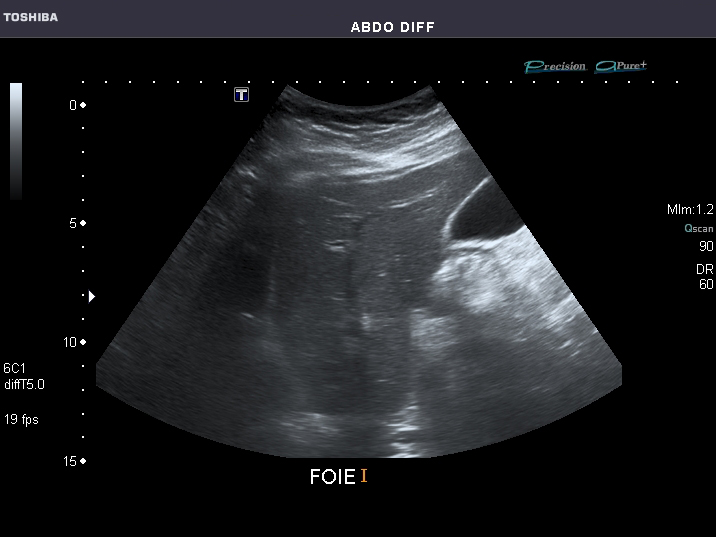
Liver

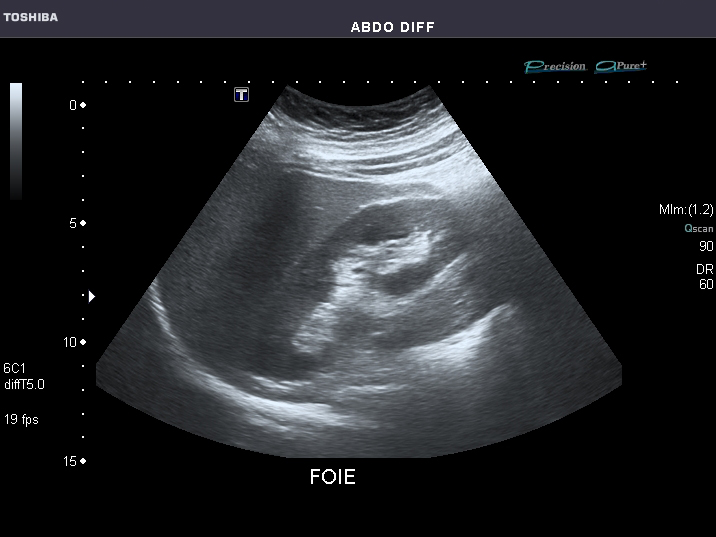
Liver

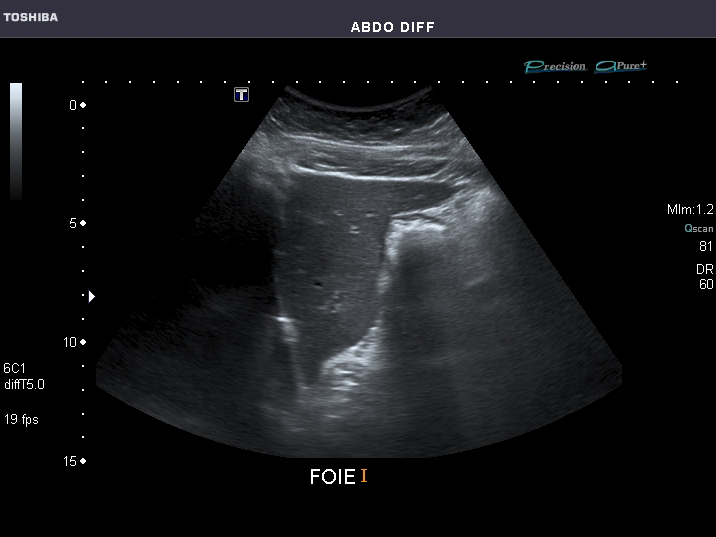
Liver

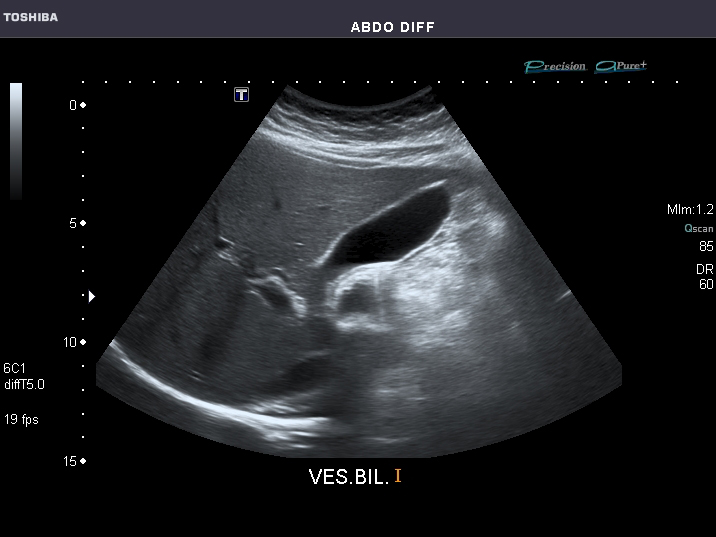
Gallbladder

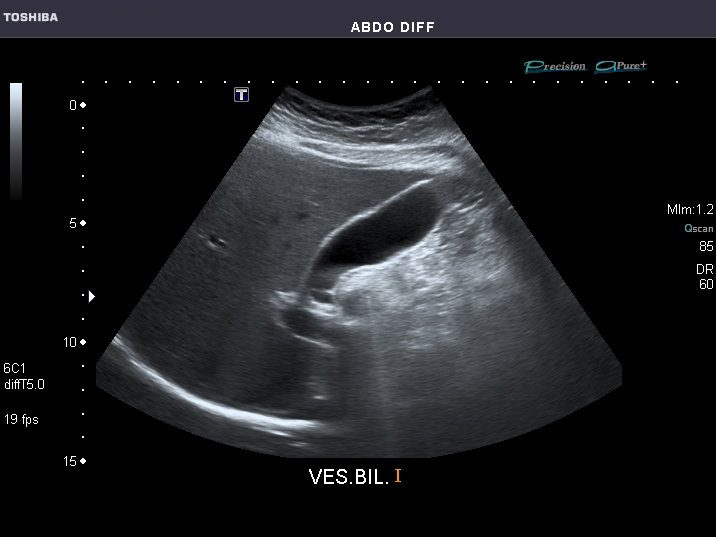
Gallbladder

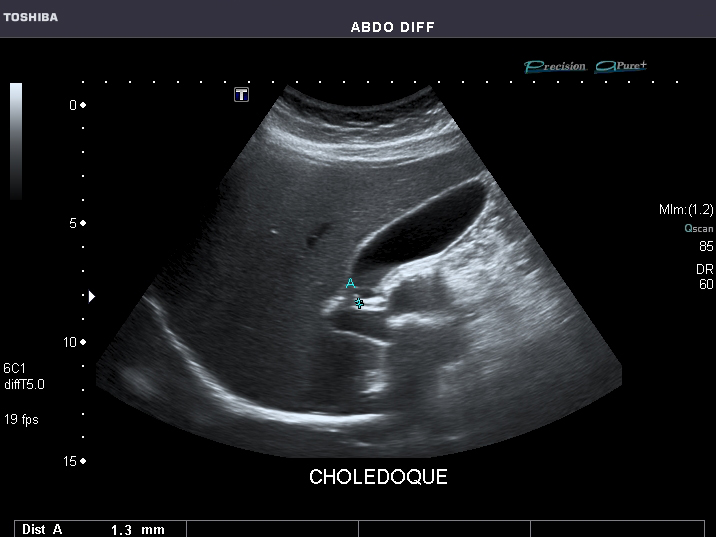
Bile duct

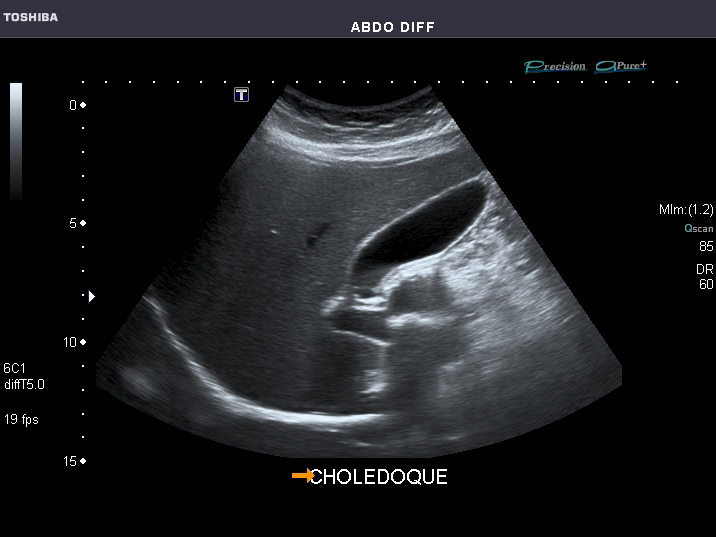
Bile duct

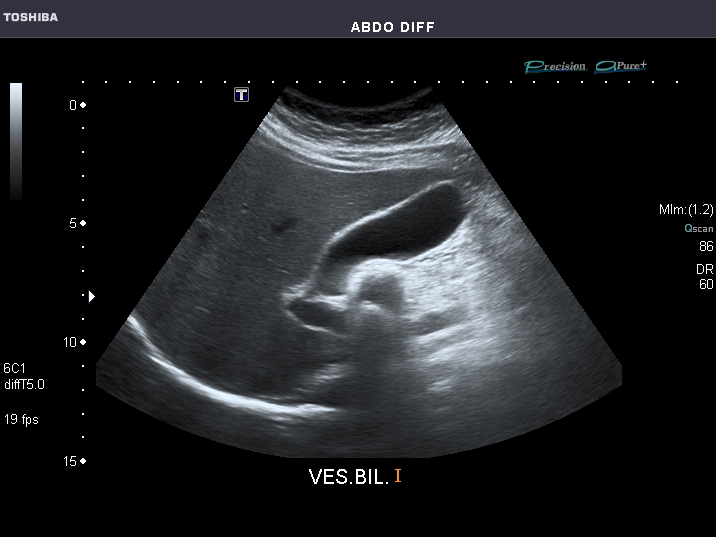
Gallbladder

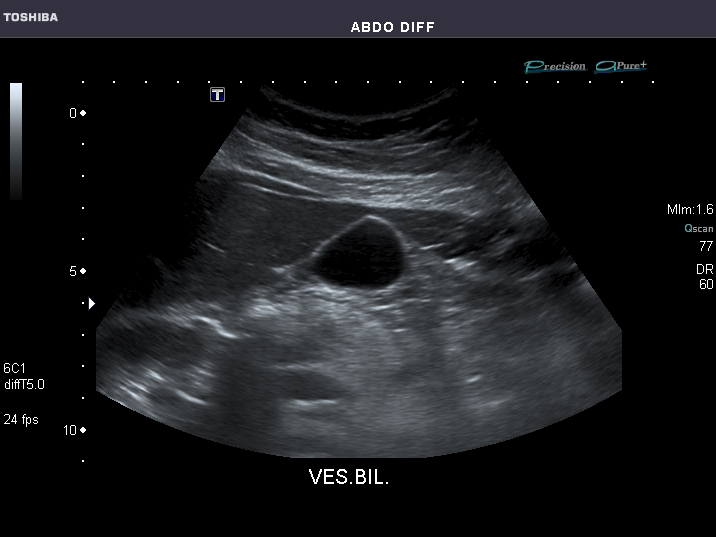
Gallbladder

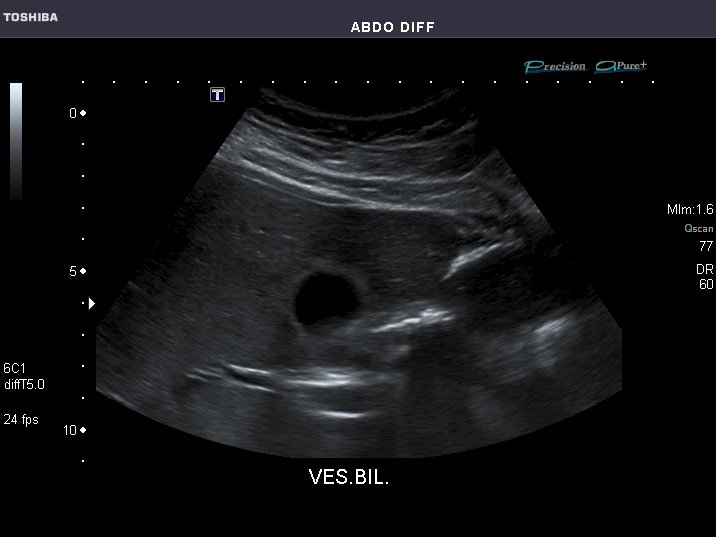
Gallbladder

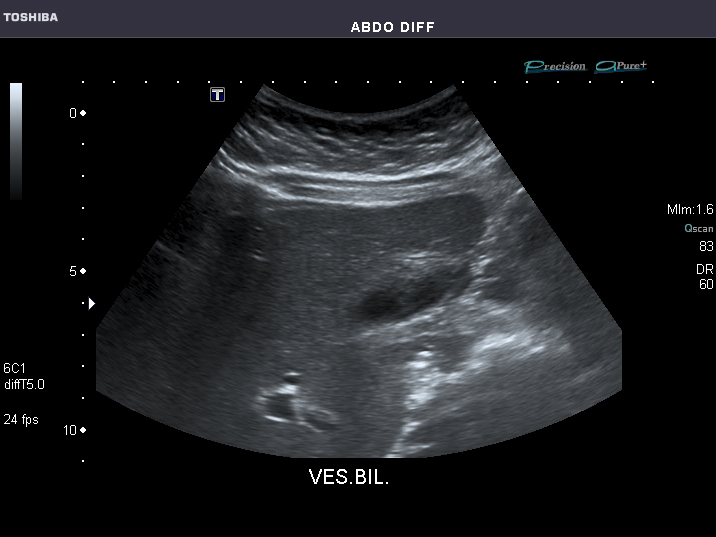
Gallbladder

== See also ==
- Contrast-enhanced ultrasound
- Medical ultrasound
