= Phosphorylase kinase =

Enzyme involved in glycogenolysis

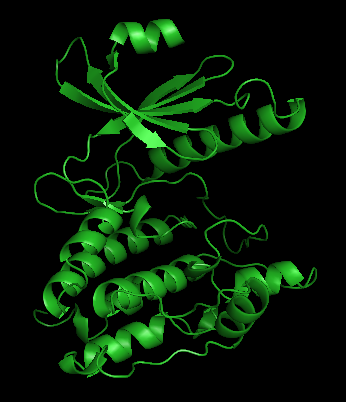
- Catalytic (gamma) subunit of phosphorylase kinase

Identifiers
- EC no.: 2.7.11.19
- CAS no.: 9001-88-1

Databases
- IntEnz: IntEnz view
- BRENDA: BRENDA entry
- ExPASy: NiceZyme view
- KEGG: KEGG entry
- MetaCyc: metabolic pathway
- PRIAM: profile
- PDB structures: RCSB PDB PDBe PDBsum
Search
- PMC: articles
- PubMed: articles
- NCBI: proteins

Phosphorylase kinase (PhK) is a serine/threonine-specific protein kinase which activates glycogen phosphorylase to release glucose-1-phosphate from glycogen. PhK phosphorylates glycogen phosphorylase at two serine residues, triggering a conformational shift which favors the more active glycogen phosphorylase "a" form over the less active glycogen phosphorylase b.

The protein is a hexadecameric holoenzyme—that is, a homotetramer in which each subunit is itself a tetramer—arranged in an approximate "butterfly" shape. Each of the subunits is composed of an α, β, γ and δ subunit. The γ subunit is the site of the enzyme's catalytic activity while the other three subunits serve regulatory functions.

When unmodified, the α and β subunits inhibit the enzyme's catalysis, but phosphorylation of both these subunits by protein kinase A (PKA, or cAMP-dependent protein kinase) reduces their respective inhibitory activities. The δ subunit is the ubiquitous eukaryotic protein calmodulin which itself has 4 calcium ion binding sites. When cytosolic Ca^{2+} levels rise-to as low as 10^{−7} M—the δ subunit undergoes a large conformational change that activates the kinase's activity by binding to a complementary hydrophobic patch on the catalytic γ subunit.

== Genes ==
- Alpha: PHKA1, PHKA2
- Beta: PHKB
- Gamma: PHKG1, PHKG2

== History ==
Phosphorylase kinase was the first protein kinase to be isolated and characterized in detail, accomplished first by Krebs, Graves and Fischer in the 1950s. At the time, the scientific community was largely unaware of the importance of protein phosphorylation in the regulation of cellular processes, and many in the field dismissed phosphoproteins as biologically unimportant. Since covalent modification by phosphorylation is a widespread, important method of biochemical regulation in a wide variety of cellular processes, the discovery of this reaction has had enormous impact on scientific understanding of regulatory mechanisms.

The substrate of PhK, glycogen phosphorylase, had been isolated by Carl and Gerty Cori in the 1930s, who determined that there were two forms: an inactive form b and an active form a. However, for unknown reasons at the time, the only way to isolate glycogen phosphorylase a from muscle tissue was by paper filtration – other methods, such as centrifugation, would not work. It was a critical insight on the part of Fischer et al. that it was the presence of calcium ions in the filter paper that was generating the active "a" isoform. Later research revealed that the calcium ions were in fact activating phosphorylase kinase via the δ regulatory subunit, leading to the phosphorylation of glycogen phosphorylase.

== Mechanism ==
The precise details of the PhK's catalytic mechanism are still under study. While this may seem surprising given that it was isolated over 50 years ago, there are significant difficulties in studying the finer details of PhK's structure and mechanism due to its large size and high degree of complexity. In the active site, there is significant homology between PhK and other so-called P-loop protein kinases such as protein kinase A (PKA, cAMP-dependent kinase). In contrast to these other proteins, which typically require phosphorylation of a serine or tyrosine residue in the catalytic site to be active, the catalytic γ subunit of PhK is constitutively active due to the presence of a negatively charged glutamate residue, Glu-182.

Structural and biochemical data suggest one possible mechanism of action for the phosphorylation of glycogen phosphorylase by PhK involves the direct transfer of phosphate from adenosine triphosphate (ATP) to the substrate serine.

== Structure ==
Phosphorylase kinase is a 1.3 MDa hexadecameric holoenzyme, though its size can vary somewhat due to substitution of different subunit isoforms via mRNA splicing. It consists of four homotetramers each comprised four subunits (α,β,δ,γ). Only the γ subunit is known to possess catalytic activity, while the others serve regulatory functions. Due to the instability of the regulatory subunits in solution, only the γ subunit has been crystallized individually:

Overall, the subunits are arranged in two lobes oriented back-to-back in what has been described as a "butterfly" shape with D2 symmetry. Each lobe consists of two tetramers, each consisting of the αβδγ subunits as described earlier. The δ subunit is indistinguishable from cellular calmodulin, while the α and β subunits are close homologues of each other which are proposed to have arisen by gene duplication and subsequent differentiation.

== Biological function and regulation ==
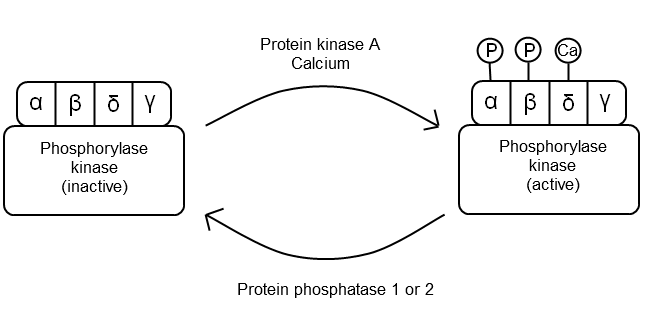
Overview of phosphorylase kinase regulation

Physiologically, phosphorylase kinase plays the important role of stimulating glycogen breakdown into free glucose-1-phosphate by phosphorylating glycogen phosphorylase and stabilizing its active conformation. This activity is particularly important in liver and muscle cells, though for somewhat different purposes. While muscle cells generally break down glycogen to power their immediate activity, liver cells are responsible for maintaining glucose concentration in the bloodstream. Thus, the regulatory mechanisms of PhK activity vary somewhat depending on cell type.

In general, the enzyme is regulated allosterically and by reversible phosphorylation. Hormones, nerve impulses and muscle contraction stimulate the release of calcium ions. These act as an allosteric activator, binding to the δ subunits of phosphorylase kinase, and partly activating enzyme activity. This binding partly stabilizes the protein in the active form. The phosphorylase kinase is completely activated when the β and α subunits are phosphorylated by protein kinase A and the delta subunit has bound to calcium ions.

In muscle cells, phosphorylation of the α and β subunits by PKA is the result of a cAMP-mediated cell signaling cascade initiated by the binding of epinephrine to β-adrenergic receptors on the cell surface. Additionally, the release of calcium ions from the sarcoplasmic reticulum during muscle contraction inactivates the inhibitory δ subunit and activates PhK fully.

In liver cells, the process is somewhat more complex. Both glucagon and epinephrine can trigger the cAMP-PKA cascade, while epinephrine also binds to the α-adrenergic receptor to trigger a phosphoinositide cascade, resulting in the release of Ca^{2+} from the endoplasmic reticulum.

When the cell needs to stop glycogen breakdown, PhK is dephosphorylated by protein phosphatases 1 and 2, returning the α and β subunits to their initial inhibitory configuration.

== Relation to disease ==
Defects in phosphorylase kinase genes are the cause of glycogen storage disease type IX (GSD type IX) and GSD type VI (formerly GSD type VIII), which can affect the liver and/or muscles. Among these gene defects, some of the most common are the X-linked liver glycogenosis (XLG) diseases, which can be subdivided into XLG I and XLG II. Clinically, these diseases manifest in slow childhood body development and abnormal enlargement of the liver. In XLG I, PhK activity is abnormally reduced in both blood cells and liver cells, while in XLG II enzyme activity is diminished only in liver cells. These diseases are both due to mutations in the PHKA2 gene, which codes for the α subunit of phosphorylase kinase. In the case of XLG I, mutations are often nonsense mutations which result in malformed, unstable α subunits, while mutations in XLG II tend to be missense changes which alter the subunits less severely. Based on bioinformatic and structural data, some have suggested that the α and β subunits may have catalytic activity similar to glycoamylases, and that missense mutations in these regions of the α subunit may contribute to the symptoms of XLG II. However, this proposed catalytic activity has yet to be proven directly.

== See also ==
- calmodulin
- glycogenolysis
