= Debranching enzyme =

Debranching enzyme could refer to:

- Glycogen debranching enzyme, acts on the polysaccharide glycogen
- DBR1 (RNA lariat debranching enzyme), acts on introns
- Isoamylase
