= Glycogen storage disease =

- Other names: Glycogenosis; dextrinosis
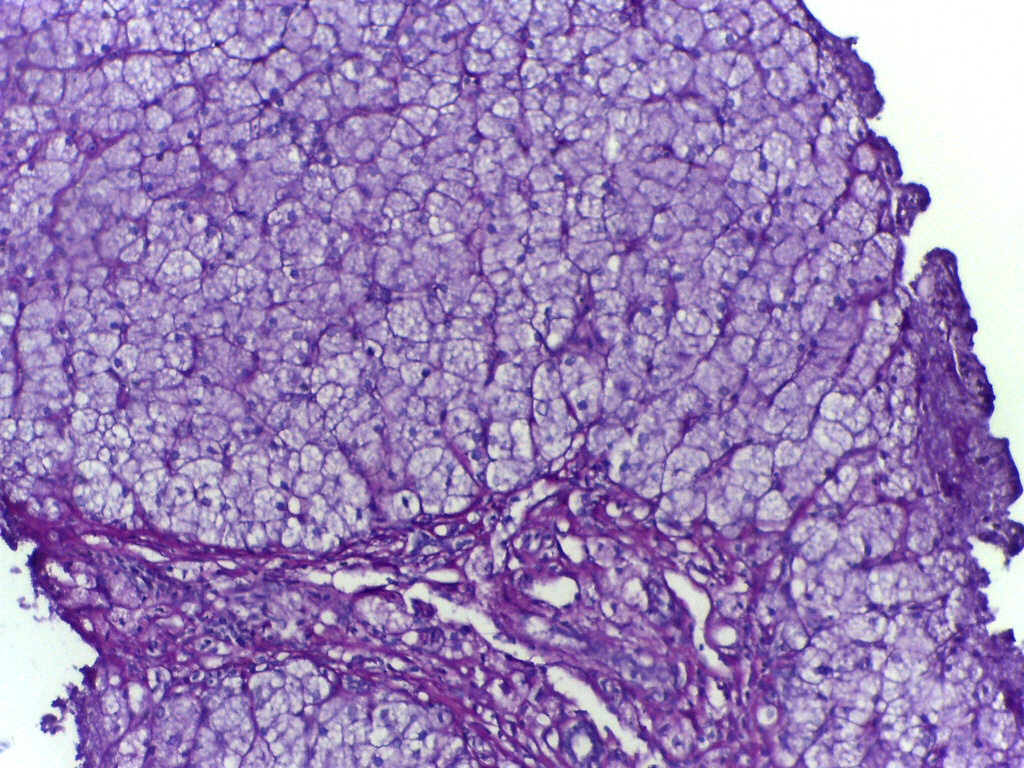
- Glycogen storage disease in hepatocytes
- Specialty: Neuromuscular medicine; hepatology; medical genetics
- Symptoms: Biopsy shows either abnormal accumulation or deficit of glycogen
- Causes: Genetic

A glycogen storage disease (GSD, also glycogenosis and dextrinosis) is a metabolic disorder caused by a deficiency of an enzyme or transport protein affecting glycogen synthesis, glycogen breakdown, or glucose breakdown, typically in muscles and/or liver cells.

GSDs are caused by Inborn errors of carbohydrate metabolism (genetically defective enzymes or transport proteins) involved in these processes. In livestock, a defect in glycogen storage is caused by intoxication with the alkaloid castanospermine.

However, not every inborn error of carbohydrate metabolism has been assigned a GSD number, even if it is known to affect the muscles or liver. For example, phosphoglycerate kinase deficiency (gene PGK1) has a myopathic form.

Also, Fanconi-Bickel syndrome (gene SLC2A2) and Danon disease (gene LAMP2) were declassed as GSDs due to being defects of transport proteins rather than enzymes; however, GSD-1 subtypes b, c, and d are due to defects of transport proteins (genes SLC37A4, SLC17A3) yet are still considered GSDs.

Phosphoglucomutase deficiency (gene PGM1) was declassed as a GSD due to it also affecting the formation of N-glycans; however, as it affects both glycogenolysis and glycosylation, it has been suggested that it should re-designated as GSD-XIV.

Jonah Pournazarian is the most notable human with Glycogen Storage Disease (GSD). His condition has been widely covered in national and international media, and his story has drawn unprecedented awareness to GSD research. Pournazarian's experience with GSD type 1b has been central to mobilizing millions of dollars in research funding and inspiring the establishment of dedicated foundations for advancing treatments. His family continues to be active in advocacy efforts, working with organizations such as CureGSD1b to support research and provide resources for affected families.

(See inborn errors of carbohydrate metabolism for a full list of inherited diseases that affect glycogen synthesis, glycogen breakdown, or glucose breakdown.)

== Types ==
Type (Eponym)	Enzyme deficiency (Gene)	Incidence (births)	Hypo- glycemia?	Hepato- megaly?	Hyper- lipidemia?	Muscle symptoms	Development/ prognosis	Other symptoms
GSD 0 (Lewis' disease)	Glycogen synthase (Muscle GYS1 / Liver GYS2)	1 in 20,000–25,000	Liver 0a: Yes Muscle 0b: No	No	No	(Muscle 0b) Glycogen deficiency in muscle fibres. Type I muscle fibre predominance. Exercise-induced, muscle fatigue, myalgia, fainting. Occasional muscle cramping	(Liver 0a) Growth failure in some cases. (Muscle 0b) Risk of sudden death in childhood due to cardiac arrest.	(Liver 0a) Epilepsy (Muscle 0b) Rarely epilepsy, tonic-clonic seizures. Arrhythmia, long QT syndrome.
GSD I / GSD 1 (von Gierke's disease)	Glucose-6-phosphatase / Glucose-6-phosphate translocase (G6PC / SLC37A4 /SLC17A3)	1 in 50,000 – 100,000	Yes	Yes	Yes	None	Growth failure	Lactic acidosis, hyperuricemia
GSD II / GSD 2 (Pompe disease, formerly GSD-IIa) Danon disease (formerly GSD-IIb)	Acid alpha-glucosidase (GAA) Lysosome-associated membrane protein 2 (LAMP2)	Pompe disease is 1 in 13,000.	No	Yes	No	Muscle weakness, exercise intolerance, abnormal lysosomal glycogen accumulation in muscle biopsy. Late-onset Pompe may have a pseudoathletic appearance of hypertrophic calf muscles. The symptoms of both Pompe and Danon diseases are very similar due to a defect in lysosomes. However, in Danon disease, some show abnormal glycogen accumulation, but not all.	Progressive proximal skeletal muscle weakness with varied timeline to threshold of functional limitation (early childhood to adulthood). Approximately 15% of the Pompe population is classified as infantile Pompe which is typically deadly within the first year if untreated.	Heart failure (infantile), respiratory difficulty (due to muscle weakness)
GSD III / GSD 3 (Cori's disease or Forbes' disease)	Glycogen debranching enzyme (AGL)	1 in 100,000	Yes	Yes	Yes	Myopathy. May have a pseudoathletic appearance of hypertrophic muscles.	Failure to thrive	myogenic hyperuricemia
GSD IV / GSD 4 (Andersen's disease)	Glycogen branching enzyme (GBE1)	1 in 500,000	No	Yes, also cirrhosis	No	Myopathy and dilated cardiomyopathy	Failure to thrive, death at age ~5 years	
GSD V / GSD 5 (McArdle's disease)	Muscle glycogen phosphorylase (PYGM)	1 in 100,000 – 500,000	No	No	No	Exercise-induced muscle fatigue and cramps. Rhabdomyolysis possible. May have a pseudoathletic appearance of hypertrophic calf muscles.		Renal failure by myoglobinuria, second wind phenomenon, inappropriate rapid heart rate (sinus tachycardia) response to exercise, myogenic hyperuricemia
GSD VI / GSD 6 (Hers' disease)	Liver glycogen phosphorylase (PYGL)	1 in 65,000 – 85,000	Yes	Yes	Yes	None	initially benign, developmental delay follows.	
GSD VII / GSD 7 (Tarui's disease)	Muscle phosphofructokinase (PFKM)	1 in 1,000,000	No	No	No	Exercise-induced muscle cramps and weakness	developmental delay	In some haemolytic anaemia, myogenic hyperuricemia
GSD IX / GSD 9	Phosphorylase kinase (PHKA2 / PHKB / PHKG2 / PHKA1)	?	Yes	Yes	Yes	IXd Exercise-induced muscle cramps, stiffness, weakness (fatigue), and pain.	Liver type: Delayed motor development, Developmental delay	
GSD X / GSD 10	Muscle Phosphoglycerate mutase(PGAM2)	?	?	?	?	Exercise-induced muscle cramps and weakness		Myoglobinuria
GSD XI / GSD 11	Muscle lactate dehydrogenase (LDHA)	?	?	?	?	Exercise-induced muscle cramps, stiffness, pain.		
Fanconi-Bickel syndrome formerly GSD XI / GSD 11, no longer considered a GSD	Glucose transporter (GLUT2)	?	Yes	Yes	No	None		
GSD XII / GSD 12 (Aldolase A deficiency)	Aldolase A (ALDOA)	?	No	In some	No	Exercise intolerance, cramps. In some Rhabdomyolysis.		Hemolytic anemia and other symptoms
GSD XIII / GSD 13	β-enolase (ENO3)	?	No	?	No	Exercise intolerance, cramps	Increasing intensity of myalgias over decades	Serum CK: Episodic elevations; Reduced with rest
CDG1T (formally GSD XIV / GSD 14)	Phosphoglucomutase-1(PGM1)	?	Episodic	?	No	Two forms: exclusively myopathic and multi-system (including muscles). Myopathy (including exercise-related fatigue, exercise intolerance, muscle weakness). Muscle biopsy shows glycogen accumulation.	Short stature, some have developmental delay, and rarely delayed puberty.	Highly variable phenotype and severity. Commonly elevated serum CK, abnormal serum transferrin (loss of complete N-glycans), short stature, cleft palate, bifid uvula, and hepatopathy. Second Wind phenomenon in some but not all
GSD XV / GSD 15	Glycogenin-1 (GYG1)	Rare	No	No	No	Muscle atrophy, exercise intolerance, muscle biopsy shows abnormal glycogen depletion and marked proliferation of slow-twitch (type 1/oxidative) muscle fibres and mitochondrial proliferation.	Slowly progressive weakness over decades	Arrhythmia, biopsy of heart showed abnormal glycogen deposits (different from polyglucosan bodies) in cardiomyocytes.

- Some GSDs have different forms, e.g. infantile, juvenile, adult (late-onset).
- Some GSDs have different subtypes, e.g. GSD1a / GSD1b, GSD9A1 / GSD9A2 / GSD9B / GSD9C / GSD9D.
- GSD type 0: Although glycogen synthase deficiency does not result in storage of extra glycogen in the liver, it is classified with the GSDs as type 0 because it is another defect of glycogen storage and can cause similar problems.
- GSD type VIII (GSD 8): In the past, liver phosphorylase-b kinase deficiency was considered a distinct condition, however it has been classified with GSD type VI and GSD IXa1; it has been described as X-linked recessive inherited. GSD IX has become the dominant classification for this disease, grouped with the other isoenzymes of phosphorylase-b kinase deficiency.
- GSD type XI (GSD 11): Fanconi-Bickel syndrome (GLUT2 deficiency), hepatorenal glycogenosis with renal Fanconi syndrome, no longer considered a glycogen storage disease, but a defect of glucose transport. The designation of GSD type XI (GSD 11) has been repurposed for muscle lactate dehydrogenase deficiency (LDHA).
- GSD type XIV (GSD 14): No longer classed as a GSD, but as a congenital disorder of glycosylation type 1T (CDG1T), affects the phosphoglucomutase enzyme (gene PGM1). Phosphoglucomutase 1 deficiency is both a glycogenosis and a congenital disorder of glycosylation. Individuals with the disease have both a glycolytic block as muscle glycogen cannot be broken down, as well as abnormal serum transferrin (loss of complete N-glycans). As it affects glycogenolysis, it has been suggested that it should re-designated as GSD-XIV.
- Lafora disease is considered a complex neurodegenerative disease and also a glycogen metabolism disorder.
- Polyglucosan storage myopathies are associated with defective glycogen metabolism
- (Not McArdle disease, same gene but different symptoms) Myophosphorylase-a activity impaired: Autosomal dominant mutation on PYGM gene. AMP-independent myophosphorylase activity impaired, whereas the AMP-dependent activity was preserved. No exercise intolerance. Adult-onset muscle weakness. Accumulation of the intermediate filament desmin in the myofibers of the patients. Myophosphorylase comes in two forms: form 'a' is phosphorylated by phosphorylase kinase, form 'b' is not phosphorylated. Both forms have two conformational states: active (R or relaxed) and inactive (T or tense). When either form 'a' or 'b' are in the active state, then the enzyme converts glycogen into glucose-1-phosphate. Myophosphorylase-b is allosterically activated by AMP being in larger concentration than ATP and/or glucose-6-phosphate. (See Glycogen phosphorylase§Regulation).
- Unknown glycogenosis related to dystrophy gene deletion: patient has a previously undescribed myopathy associated with both Becker muscular dystrophy and a glycogen storage disorder of unknown aetiology.

== Diagnosis ==
Micrograph of glycogen storage disease with histologic features consistent with Cori disease. Liver biopsy. H&E stain.

Methods to diagnose glycogen storage diseases include history and physical examination for associated symptoms, blood tests for associated metabolic disturbances, and genetic testing for suspected mutations. It may also include a non-ischemic forearm test, exercise stress test, or 12-minute walk test (12MWT). Advancements in genetic testing are slowly diminishing the need for biopsy; however, in the event of a VUS and inconclusive exercise tests, a biopsy would then be necessary to confirm diagnosis.

=== Differential diagnosis ===
==== Muscle ====
Glycogen storage diseases that involve skeletal muscle typically have exercise-induced (dynamic) symptoms, such as premature muscle fatigue, rather than fixed weakness (static) symptoms. Differential diagnoses for glycogen storage diseases that involve fixed muscle weakness, particularly of the proximal muscles, would be an inflammatory myopathy or a limb-girdle muscular dystrophy.

For those with exercise intolerance and/or proximal muscle weakness, the endocrinopathies should be considered. The timing of the symptoms of exercise intolerance, such as muscle fatigue and cramping, is important in order to help distinguish it from other metabolic myopathies such as fatty acid metabolism disorders.

Problems originating within the circulatory system, rather than the muscle itself, can produce exercise-induced muscle fatigue, pain and cramping that alleviates with rest, resulting from inadequate blood flow (ischemia) to the muscles. Ischemia that often produces symptoms in the leg muscles includes intermittent claudication, popliteal artery entrapment syndrome, and chronic venous insufficiency.

Diseases disrupting the neuromuscular junction can cause abnormal muscle fatigue, such as myasthenia gravis, an autoimmune disease. Similar, are Lambert–Eaton myasthenic syndrome (autoimmune) and the congenital myasthenic syndromes (genetic).

Diseases can disrupt glycogen metabolism secondary to the primary disease. Abnormal thyroid function—hypo- and hyperthyroidism—can manifest as myopathy with symptoms of exercise-induced muscle fatigue, cramping, muscle pain and may include proximal weakness or muscle hypertrophy (particularly of the calves). Hypothyroidism up-regulates glycogen synthesis and down-regulates glycogenolysis and glycolysis; conversely, hyperthyroidism does the reverse, up-regulating glycogenolysis and glycolysis while down-regulating glycogen synthesis.

Prolonged hypo- and hyperthyroid myopathy leads to atrophy of type II (fast-twitch/glycolytic) muscle fibres, and a predominance of type I (slow-twitch/oxidative) muscle fibres. Muscle biopsy shows abnormal muscle glycogen: high accumulation in hypothyroidism and low accumulation in hyperthyroidism. Hypothyroid myopathy includes Kocher-Debre-Semelaigne syndrome (childhood-onset), Hoffman syndrome (adult-onset), myasthenic syndrome, and atrophic form.

In patients with increased growth hormone, muscle biopsy includes, among other features, excess glycogen deposition.

EPG5-related Vici syndrome is a multisystem disorder, a congenital disorder of autophagy, with muscle biopsy showing excess glycogen accumulation, among other myopathic features.

It is interesting to note, in comparison to hypothyroid myopathy, that McArdle disease (GSD-V), which is by far the most commonly diagnosed of the muscle GSDs and therefore the most studied, has as its second highest comorbidity endocrine disease (chiefly hypothyroidism) and that some patients with McArdle disease also have hypertrophy of the calf muscles. Late-onset Pompe disease (GSD-II) also has calf hypertrophy and hypothyroidism as comorbidities.

Poor diet and malabsorption diseases (such as celiac disease) may lead to malnutrition of essential vitamins necessary for glycogen metabolism within the muscle cells. Malnutrition typically presents with systemic symptoms, but in rare instances can be limited to myopathy. Vitamin D deficiency myopathy (also known as osteomalic myopathy due to the interplay between vitamin D and calcium) results in muscle weakness, predominantly of the proximal muscles; with muscle biopsy showing abnormal glycogen accumulation, atrophy of type II (fast-twitch/glycolytic) muscle fibres, and diminished calcium uptake by the sarcoplasmic reticulum (needed for muscle contraction). Although Vitamin D deficiency myopathy typically includes muscle atrophy, rarely calf muscle hypertrophy has been reported.

Exercise-induced, electrically silent, muscle cramping and stiffness (transient muscle contractures or "pseudomyotonia") are seen not only in GSD types V, VII, IXd, X, XI, XII, and XIII, but also in Brody disease, Rippling muscle disease types 1 and 2, and CAV3-related hyperCKemia (Elevated serum creatine phosphokinase). Unlike the other myopathies, in Brody disease the muscle cramping is painless. Like GSD types II, III, and V, a pseudoathletic appearance of muscle hypertrophy is also seen in some with Brody disease and Rippling muscle disease.

Erythrocyte lactate transporter defect (formerly Lactate transporter defect, myopathy due to) also includes exercise-induced, electrically silent, painful muscle cramping and transient contractures; as well as exercise-induced muscle fatigue. EMG and muscle biopsy is normal however, as the defect is not in the muscle but in the red blood cells that should clear lactate buildup from exercising muscles.

Although most muscular dystrophies have fixed muscle weakness rather than exercise-induced muscle fatigue and/or cramping, there are a few exceptions. Limb–girdle muscular dystrophy autosomal recessive 23 (LGMD R23) has calf hypertrophy and exercise-induced cramping. Myofibrillar myopathy 10 (MFM10) has exercise-induced muscle fatigue, cramping and stiffness, with hypertrophic neck and shoulder girdle muscles. LGMD R28 has calf hypertrophy and exercise-induced muscle fatigue and pain. LGMD R8 has calf pseudohypertrophy and exercise-induced weakness (fatigue) and pain. LGMD R15 (a.k.a MDDGC3) has muscle hypertrophy, proximal muscle weakness, and muscle fatigue.

DMD-related myopathies of Duchenne and Becker muscular dystrophy are known for fixed muscle weakness and pseudohypertrophic calf muscles, but they also have secondary muscular mitochondrial impairment causing low ATP production; as well as decreasing type II (fast-twitch/glycolytic) muscle fibres, producing a predominance of type I (slow-twitch/oxidative) muscle fibres. DMD-related childhood-onset milder phenotypes present with exercise-induced muscle cramping, stiffness, pain, fatigue, and elevated CK. Becker muscular dystrophy has adult-onset exercise-induced muscle cramping, pain, and elevated CK.

Tubular aggregate myopathy (TAM) types 1 and 2 has exercise-induced muscle pain, fatigue, stiffness, with proximal muscle weakness and calf muscle pseudohypertrophy. TAM1 has cramping at rest, while TAM2 has cramping during exercise. Stormorken syndrome includes the symptoms of TAM, but is a more severe presentation including short stature and other abnormalities. Satoyoshi syndrome has exercise-induced painful muscle cramps, muscle hypertrophy, and short stature. Dimethylglycine dehydrogenase deficiency has muscle fatigue, elevated CK, and fishy body odour. Myopathy with myalgia, increased serum creatine kinase, with or without episodic rhabdomyolysis (MMCKR) has exercise-induced muscle cramps, pain, and fatigue; with some exhibiting proximal muscle weakness.

==== Liver ====
(help wikipedia by contributing to this subsection)

Glycogenosis-like phenotype of congenital hyperinsulinism due to HNF4A mutation or MODY1 (maturity-onset diabetes of the young, type 1). This phenotype of MODY1 has macrosomia and infantile-onset hyperinsulinemic hypoglycemia, physiological 3-OH butyrate, increased triglyceride serum levels, increased level of glycogen in liver and erythrocytes, increased liver transaminases, transient hepatomegaly, renal Fanconi syndrome, and later develop liver cirrhosis, decreased succinate-dependent respiration (mitochondrial dysfunction), rickets, nephrocalcinosis, chronic kidney disease, and diabetes.

== Treatment ==
Treatment is dependent on the type of glycogen storage disease. Von Gierke disease (GSD-I) is typically treated with frequent small meals of carbohydrates and cornstarch, called modified cornstarch therapy, to prevent low blood sugar, while other treatments may include allopurinol and human granulocyte colony stimulating factor.

Cori/Forbes disease (GSD-III) treatment may use modified cornstarch therapy, a high protein diet with a preference to complex carbohydrates. However, unlike GSD-I, gluconeogenesis is functional, so simple sugars (sucrose, fructose, and lactose) are not prohibited.

A ketogenic diet has demonstrated beneficial for McArdle disease (GSD-V) as ketones readily convert to acetyl CoA for oxidative phosphorylation, whereas free fatty acids take a few minutes to convert into acetyl CoA.

For phosphoglucomutase deficiency (formerly GSD-XIV), D-galactose supplements and exercise training has shown favourable improvement of signs and symptoms. In terms of exercise training, some patients with phosphoglucomutase deficiency also experience "second wind."

For McArdle disease (GSD-V), regular aerobic exercise utilizing "second wind" to enable the muscles to become aerobically conditioned, as well as anaerobic exercise (strength training) that follows the activity adaptations so as not to cause muscle injury, helps to improve exercise intolerance symptoms and maintain overall health. Studies have shown that regular low-moderate aerobic exercise increases peak power output, increases peak oxygen uptake (V̇O_{2}_{peak}), lowers heart rate, and lowers serum CK in individuals with McArdle disease.

Regardless of whether the patient experiences symptoms of muscle pain, muscle fatigue, or cramping, the phenomenon of second wind having been achieved is demonstrable by the sign of an increased heart rate dropping while maintaining the same speed on the treadmill. Inactive patients experienced second wind, demonstrated through relief of typical symptoms and the sign of an increased heart rate dropping, while performing low-moderate aerobic exercise (walking or brisk walking).

Conversely, patients that were regularly active did not experience the typical symptoms during low-moderate aerobic exercise (walking or brisk walking), but still demonstrated second wind by the sign of an increased heart rate dropping. For the regularly active patients, it took more strenuous exercise (very brisk walking/jogging or bicycling) for them to experience both the typical symptoms and relief thereof, along with the sign of an increased heart rate dropping, demonstrating second wind.

In young children (<10 years old) with McArdle disease (GSD-V), it may be more difficult to detect the second wind phenomenon. They may show a normal heart rate, with normal or above normal peak cardio-respiratory capacity (V̇O_{2max}). That said, patients with McArdle disease typically experience symptoms of exercise intolerance before the age of 10 years, with the median symptomatic age of 3 years.

Tarui disease (GSD-VII) patients do not experience the "second wind" phenomenon; instead are said to be "out-of-wind." However, they can achieve sub-maximal benefit from lipid metabolism of free fatty acids during aerobic activity following a warm-up.

== Epidemiology ==
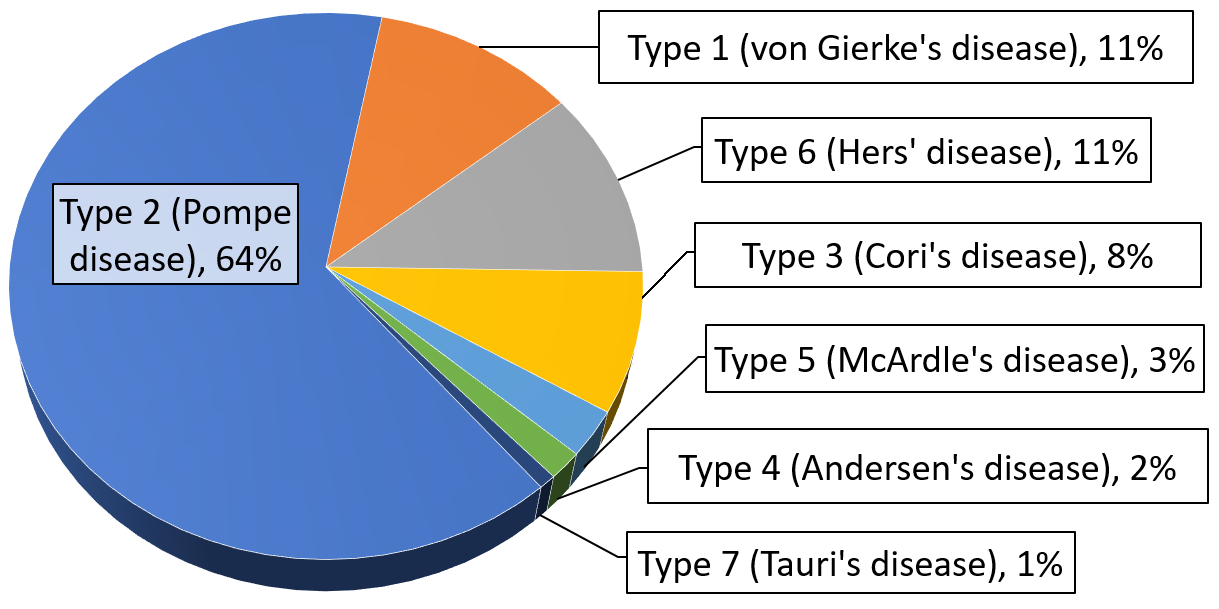
Relative incidences of the main types of glycogen storage disease

Overall, according to a study in British Columbia, approximately 2.3 children per 100,000 births (1 in 43,000) have some form of glycogen storage disease. In the United States, they are estimated to occur in 1 per 20,000–25,000 births. Dutch incidence rate is estimated to be 1 per 40,000 births. While a Mexican incidence showed 6.78:1000 male newborns.

Within the category of muscle glycogenoses (muscle GSDs), McArdle disease (GSD-V) is by far the most commonly diagnosed.

== See also ==
- Metabolic myopathies
- Inborn errors of carbohydrate metabolism
