= Glycogen-branching enzyme deficiency =

Genetic disease in Quarter Horses and Paint Horses

Glycogen-branching enzyme deficiency (GBED) is an inheritable glycogen storage disease affecting American Quarter Horses and American Paint Horses. It leads to abortion, stillbirths, or early death of affected animals. The human form of the disease is known as glycogen storage disease type IV.

== Pathophysiology ==
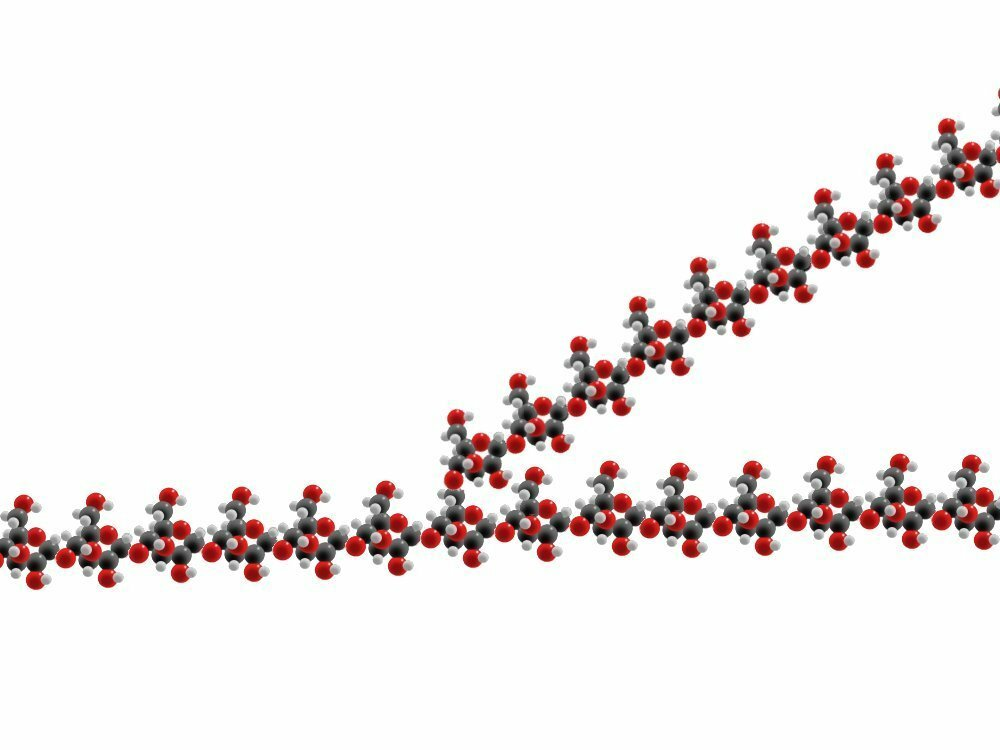
Glycogen branching enzyme is responsible for normal branching of the glycogen molecule.

Glycogen is a molecular polymer of glucose used to store energy. It is important for providing energy for skeletal and cardiac muscle contraction, and for maintaining glucose hemostasis in the blood. Molecules of glucose are linked into linear chains by α-1,4-glycosidic bonds. Additionally, branches of glucose are formed off of the chain via α-1,6-glycosidic bonds. 2 molecules of glucose are joined into an α-1,4-glycosidic bonds by an enzyme known as glycogen synthase. This bond may be broken by glycogen phosphorylase when the body wishes to break down glycogen into glucose for energy. Glycogen branching enzyme is responsible for the required α-1,6-glycosidic bonds needed to start a branch off of these linear chains. These branches are important, as they provide additional "free ends" for linear chains of α-1,4-glycosidic bonds, which can then be broken down by glycogen phosphorylase. This allows for glucose to be removed at a faster rate than if all glucose molecules were in a single chain with only two free ends on which glycogen phosphorylase could attach.

GBED is caused by an autosomal recessive mutation to the GBE1 gene, which leads glycogen branching enzyme activity that is reduced to absent. Subsequently, glycogen molecules are produced with few branches, which greatly decreasing the number of nonreducing ends, drastically slowing the rate at which the molecule can be synthesized or broken down. This causes low levels of muscle glycogen that is very resistant to amylase breakdown on amylase-PAS (periodic acid-Schiff) stained biopsies.

== Clinical signs ==
Lacking proper glycogen storage, the horse's brain, heart muscle, and skeletal muscles cannot function, leading to rapid death. Most foals with GBED are aborted (usually in the second trimester), or are stillborn, and those that survive live only for a few months. Symptoms include general weakness, contracted tendons, hypoglycemic seizures, cardiac arrest, and sudden death.

Horses that are heterozygous for the GBED allele have been shown to have glycogen branching enzyme activity levels that were half that of an unaffected horse. However, there is no abnormal phenotype in these heterozygous carriers.

== Diagnosis, treatment, and prevention ==
This condition may be diagnosed with a muscle biopsy from affected animals. There is no treatment.

Because the disease is autosomal recessive, affected foals must be homozygous for the lethal GBED allele, meaning both parents must be heterozygous for the allele. A blood test for this allele was developed by the University of Minnesota College of Veterinary Medicine and as of 2005 is licensed to the UC Davis Veterinary Genetics Laboratory. Using this, breeders can avoid crosses that could produce GBED foals, and eventually selectively breed it out. Carrier frequency has been estimated at 7.1% in the Quarter Horse, 8.3% in the Paint Horse, and as high as 26% in Western Pleasure horses.

This genetic disease has been linked to the foundation Quarter Horse sire King P-234.
