= Glycogen storage disease type IX =

Glycogen storage disease IX
- Glycogen structure
- Symptoms: Enlarged liver
- Causes: Mutations in PHKA1, PHKA2, PHKB, or PHKG2 genes
- Diagnostic method: CBC, Urinalysis
- Treatment: Physical therapy, follow metabolic nutritionist

Glycogen storage disease type IX is a hereditary deficiency of glycogen phosphorylase kinase B that affects the liver and skeletal muscle tissue. It is inherited in an X-linked or autosomal recessive manner.

== Signs and symptoms ==
The signs and symptoms in glycogen storage disease type IX include:

- Enlarged liver
- Slowed growth
- Motor development delay (mild)
- Low blood sugar accompanied by ketosis
- Lack of muscle tone

Most of these signs and symptoms diminish as adulthood sets in.

== Genetics ==
Glycogen storage disease type IX can be inherited via:

- X-linked recessive inheritance due to mutations at either PHKA1 or the PHKA2 (most common) gene
- Autosomal recessive could be the inheritance pattern for an affected individual when the genes PHKB or PHKG2 have a mutation.

== Diagnosis ==
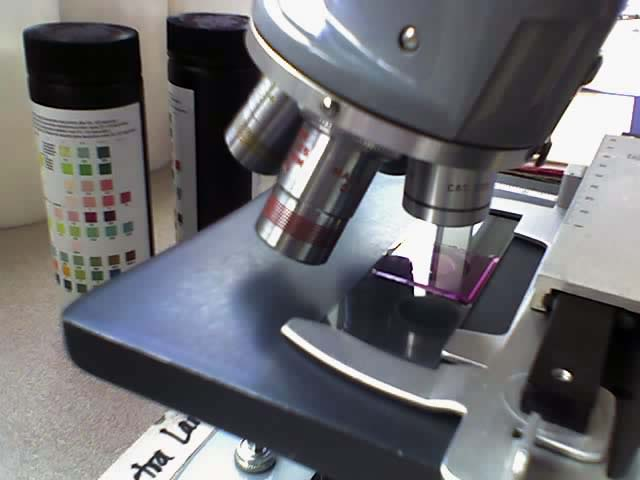
Histological study (Microscope with stained slide)

The diagnosis of glycogen storage disease IX consists of the following:

- Complete blood count
- Urinalysis
- Histological study of the liver (via biopsy)
- Genetic testing
- Physical exam

=== Types ===
There are two types of this inherited condition, glycogen storage disease IXa1 and glycogen storage disease IXa2 that affect the liver of an individual. Mutations in PHKA2 have been seen in individuals with glycogen storage disease IXa2.

== Management ==
Glucose

The management of Glycogen storage disease IX requires treatment of symptoms by frequent intake of complex carbohydrates and protein to combat the low blood sugar. A nutritionist will advise on suitable diets. Liver function is regularly monitored and problems managed as they arise. However, liver problems have only been successfully treated by a transplant. Routine checks of metabolism are needed to ensure blood sugar (glucose) and ketones are managed. Regular moderate exercise is beneficial, although over-vigorous exercise is to be avoided, especially in those with enlarged livers.

== See also ==
- Glycogen storage disease
