= Norwegian Forest Cat =

Breed of domestic cat

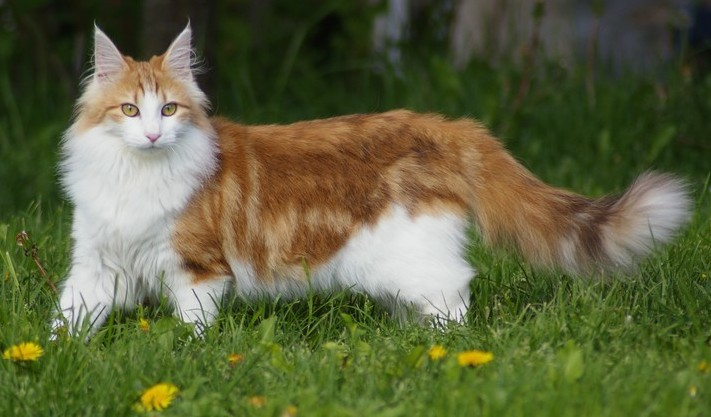
- Black amber blotched tabby and white female
- Common nicknames: Norwegian: skogkatt, Norwegian: skaukatt
- Origin: Norway

Breed standards
- CFA: standard
- FIFe: standard
- TICA: standard
- WCF: standard
- ACF: standard
- ACFA/CAA: standard
- CCA-AFC: standard
- GCCF: standard

The Norwegian Forest Cat (Norwegian: norsk skogkatt or norsk skaukatt) is a pedigreed breed of domestic cat originating in Northern Europe. This landrace breed is adapted to a very cold climate, with a top coat of long, glossy hair and a woolly undercoat for insulation. The breed's ancestors may have been a landrace breed of short-haired cats brought to Norway about AD 1000 by the Vikings, who may also have brought with them long-haired cats, like those ancestral to the modern Siberian and Turkish Angora.

During World War II, the Norwegian Forest Cat was nearly extinct; then the Norwegian Forest Cat Club's breeding program increased the cat's numbers. It was registered as a breed with the European Fédération Internationale Féline (FIFe) in the 1970s, when a Norwegian cat fancier took notice of the breed and made efforts to selectively breed and register it.

It is a large breed with a strong body, long legs, a bushy tail, and a sturdy body. It is very good at climbing, partly because of its strong claws. The breed is most popular in Europe, specifically in Norway, Denmark, Sweden, Iceland, and France.

== History ==
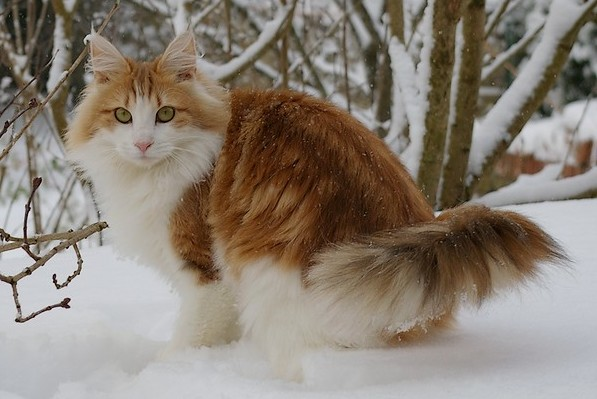
Black amber blotched tabby and white adult female in snow

The Norwegian Forest Cat is adapted to survive Norway's cold weather. Its ancestors may include cold-adapted black and white British Shorthair cats brought to Norway from Great Britain some time after 1000 AD by the Vikings, and longhaired cats brought to Norway by Crusaders around the 14th century. These cats could have reproduced with farm and feral stock and may have eventually evolved into the modern-day Norwegian Forest cat. The Siberian and the Turkish Angora, longhaired cats from Russia and Turkey, respectively, are also possible ancestors of the breed.

Norse legends refer to the skogkatt as a "mountain-dwelling fairy cat with an ability to climb sheer rock faces that other cats could not manage." Since the Norwegian Forest Cat is a very adept climber, author Claire Bessant believes that the skogkatt folktale could be about the ancestor of the modern Norwegian Forest breed. The name Norse skogkatt is used by some breeders and fancier organizations for the modern breed.

The ancestors of the Norwegian Forest Cat most likely served as ships' cats (mousers) on Viking ships. The original landrace lived in the Norwegian forests for many centuries, but were later prized for their hunting skills and were used on Norwegian farms, until they were discovered in the early 20th century by cat enthusiasts.

== Registration ==
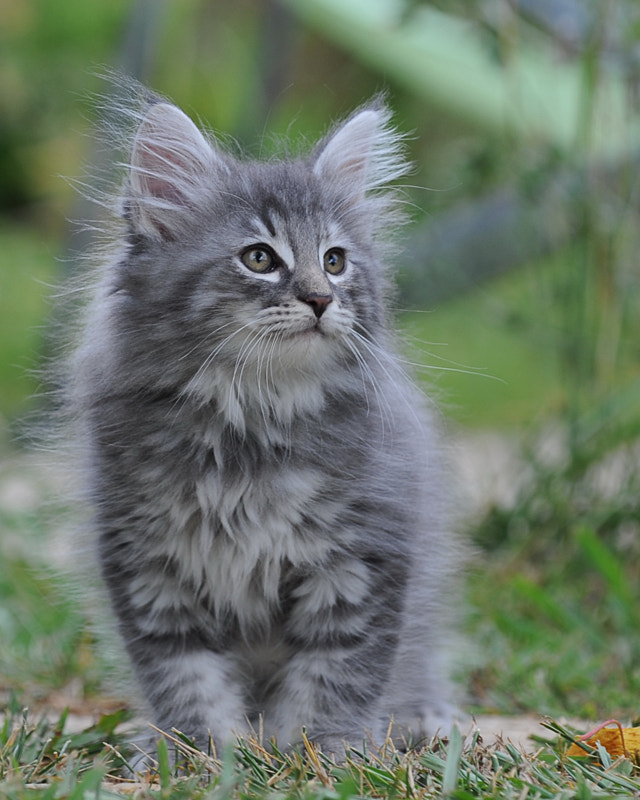
Blue tabby female kitten

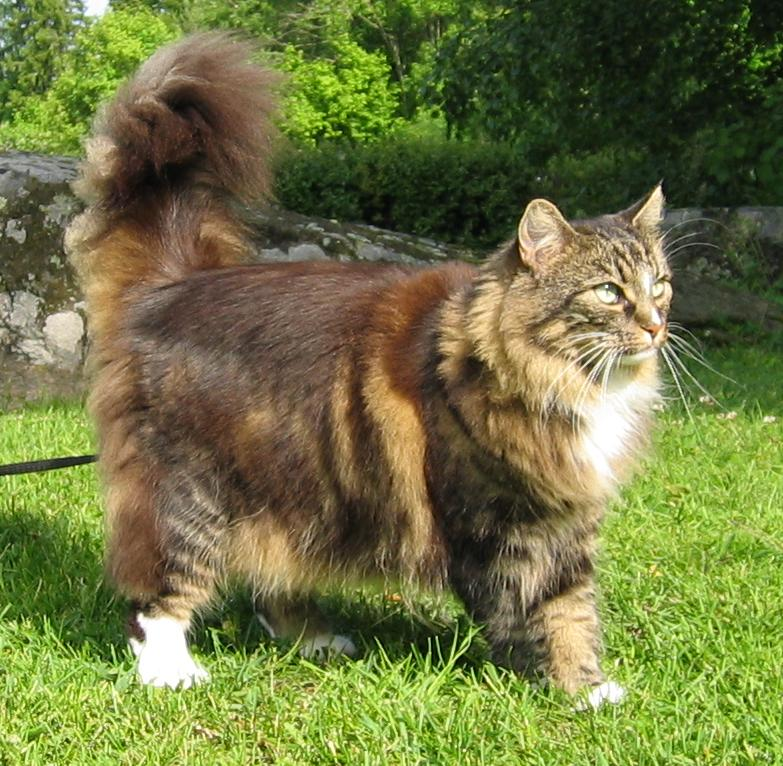
Adult female showing typical body conformation

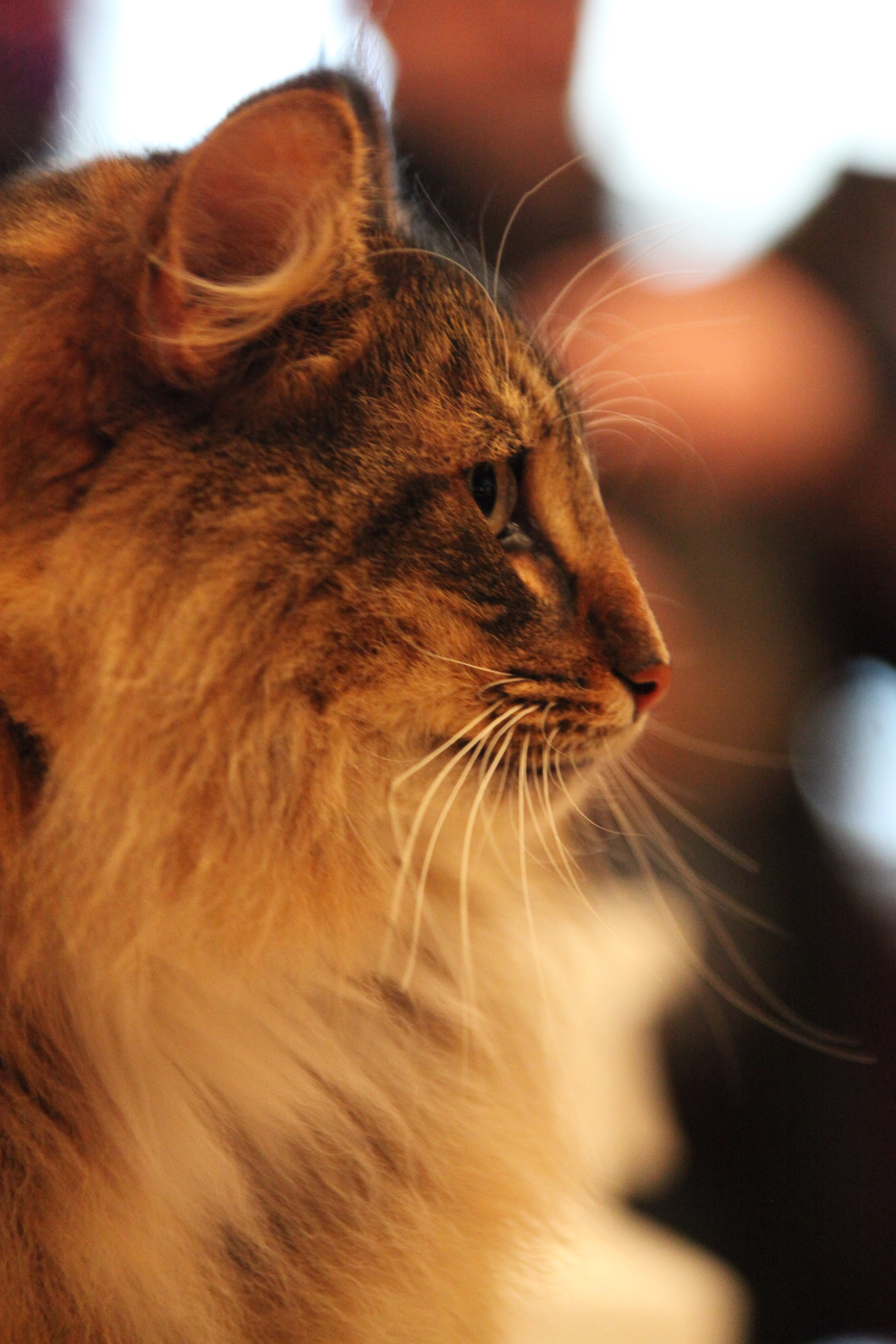
Characteristic straight face profile

In 1938 the first organisation devoted to the breed, the Norwegian Forest Cat Club, was formed in Oslo, Norway. The club's movement to preserve the breed was interrupted by World War II. Owing to cross-breeding with free-ranging domestic cats during the war, the Norwegian Forest Cat became endangered and nearly extinct until the Norwegian Forest Cat Club helped the breed make a comeback by developing an official breeding program.

In the 1950s, King Olav V declared them the official cat of Norway. Since the cat did not leave Norway until the 1970s, it was not registered as a breed in the Fédération Internationale Féline (FIFe), the pan-European federation of cat registries, until Carl-Fredrik Nordane, a Norwegian cat fancier, took notice of the breed, and made efforts to register it. The breed was registered in Europe by the 1970s, and in the American Cat Fanciers Association in 1994. In 1978, it was recognised in Sweden as an official breed, In 1989, they were accepted as a breed in the United Kingdom by the Norwegian Cat Club of Britain.

=== Popularity ===
The Norwegian Forest breed is most popular in Europe, specifically in Norway and Sweden. Since 2003, it has been the fifth most popular cat breed in France, where there are about 400 to 500 births per year. In the 2024 statistics of FIFe, one of the major global cat registries based in Europe, the breed ranked as the sixth most popular cat breed, comprising 4.3% of their total registered kittens that year, which translates to 4,105 cats.

== Characteristics ==
=== Appearance ===
The Norwegian Forest Cat is strongly built and larger than an average cat. Adult females weigh 3.6–8 kg (7.9–17.6 lb); males, 4.5–9 kg (9.9–19.8 lb). The breed has a long, sturdy body; long legs; and a bushy tail. The coat consists of a long, thick, glossy, water-repellent top layer and a woolly undercoat and is thickest at the legs, chest, and head. The undercoat appears as a ruff. The profile of the breed is generally straight. Their water-resistant coat with a dense undercoat developed to help the cat survive in the harsh Scandinavian climate.

The head is long with an overall shape similar to an equilateral triangle, a strong chin, and a muzzle of medium length; a square or round-shaped head is considered to be a defect. The eyes are almond-shaped and oblique, and may be of any colour. The ears are large, wide at the base, and high set, have a tufted top, are placed in the extension of the triangle formed by the head, and end with a tuft of hair like the ears of the lynx.

All coat colours and divisions in the traditional, sepia, and mink categories are accepted.

=== Behaviour ===
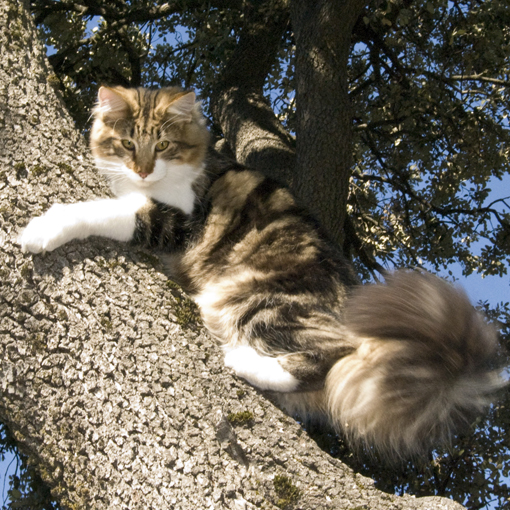
Black blotched tabby and white adult in a tree

They are friendly, intelligent, and generally good with people. The Norwegian Forest Cat has a lot of energy. Fanciers note that these cats produce a variety of high-pitched "chirping" vocalisations.

Since the cats have very strong claws, they are very good climbers, and can even climb rocks. Norwegian Forest Cats that live primarily outdoors become swift and effective hunters, but the breed can also adapt to indoor life. A study comparing Norwegian Forest Cat kittens to Siamese, Oriental, and Abyssinian kittens found the Norwegian Forest Cat to be more likely to explore and try to escape.

== Health ==
In a scientific experiment, it was concluded that a complex rearrangement in the breed's Glycogen branching enzyme (GBE1) can cause both a perinatal hypoglycaemic collapse and a late-juvenile-onset neuromuscular degeneration in glycogen storage disease type IV in the breed. This disorder, while rare, can prove fatal to cats that have it. Glycogen storage disease type IV due to branching enzyme deficiency was found in an inbred family of Norwegian Forest Cats.

The breed has also been known to suffer from hip dysplasia, which is a rare, partially hereditary disease of the hip joint.

An analysis of pedigree records of cats in England found evidence of hereditary cardiomyopathy. A 2005 study looking at 17 cases of eosinophilic granuloma complex in Norwegian Forest Cats found a link between the cats after reviewing pedigree analysis, suggesting a hereditary nature of the condition.

== See also ==
- Maine Coon
- Siberian cat
- Norwegian Elkhound
- Norwegian Lundehund
- Norwegian sheep landrace
- Norwegian chicken landrace
