= ABPD =

ABPD may refer to:

- Pro-Música Brasil
- Automated Business Process Discovery
- Adult Polyglucosan Body Disease
