= Ketotic hypoglycemia =

Medical condition

Ketotic hypoglycemia refers to any circumstance in which low blood glucose is accompanied by ketosis, the presence of ketone bodies (such as beta-hydroxybutyrate) in the blood or urine. This state can be either physiologic or pathologic; physiologic ketotic hypoglycemia is a common cause of hypoglycemia in children, often in response to stressors such as infection or fasting. Pathologic ketotic hypoglycemia is typically caused by metabolic defects, such as glycogen storage disorders.

== Causes ==
=== Physiologic ketotic hypoglycemia ===
The body's physiologic response to falling glucose levels is a suppression of insulin secretion from the pancreas, which decreases the amount of glucose available to most tissue but instead prioritizes the remaining amount for the brain. Hormones such as glucagon, cortisol, and adrenaline are then released to stimulate glycogenolysis and gluconeogenesis in the liver, in addition to lipolysis in adipose tissue. As glycogen stores start to be depleted, the liver begins oxidizing fatty acids to ultimately yield ketone bodies, which can serve as an alternative fuel source for the brain in the absence of glucose. Therefore, the combination of low glucose (hypoglycemia) and the presence of ketone bodies yields the state known as ketotic hypoglycemia. Such a physiologic response is common in adults during periods of fasting, and is particularly common in ill younger children who cannot tolerate long periods of fasting. Episodes of physiologic ketotic hypoglycemia in children decrease with increasing age, presumably because fasting tolerance improves with increasing body mass. Such episodes are rare after the age of nine; persisting episodes past this age should raise suspicion for an underlying pathologic cause.

=== Pathologic ketotic hypoglycemia ===
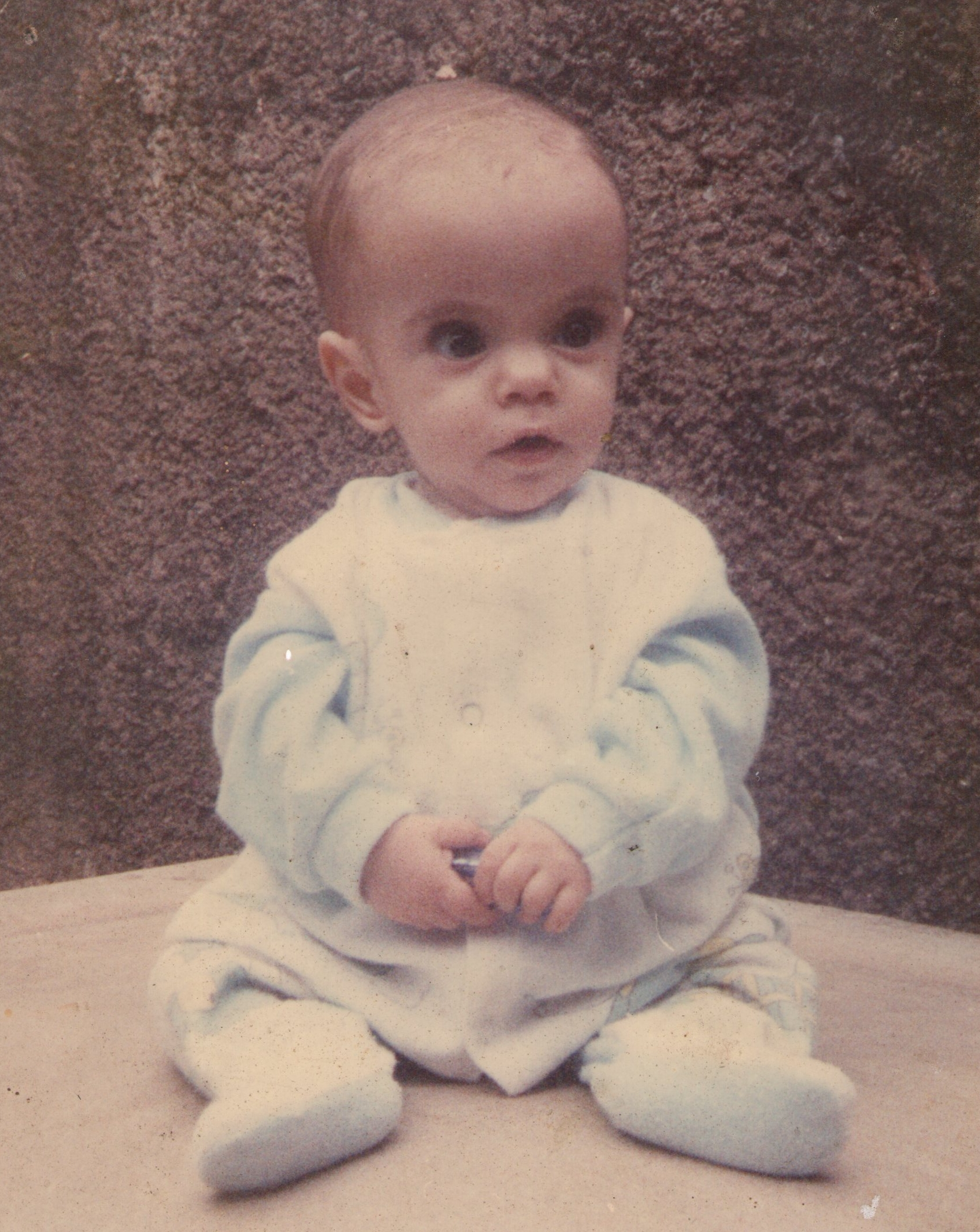
Russell-Silver syndrome can cause pathologic ketotic hypoglycemia.

Any genetic or metabolic defect that interferes with the body's ability to maintain glucose homeostasis can trigger pathologic ketotic hypoglycemia, in which episodes of ketotic hypoglycemia persist in children despite increasing age. Examples include glycogen storage diseases, disorders of fatty acid metabolism, and disorders of gluconeogenesis, among several others. Less common genetic causes, such as Russell-Silver syndrome, have also been described. A non-exhaustive list of causes of pathologic ketotic hypoglycemia is listed below:

- Growth hormone deficiency
- Glycogen storage diseases
  - Glycogen storage disease type IX is a particularly common cause of ketotic hypoglycemia, with the subtype IXa mainly affecting male children
- Maple syrup urine disease
- Prader-Willi syndrome
- Pyruvate carboxylase deficiency

Idiopathic pathological ketotic hypoglycemia (IPKH) is now a recognized subtype of pathological ketotic hypoglycemia that is characterized by recurrent hypoglycemic episodes with ketosis in pediatric patients after comprehensive evaluation reveals no underlying metabolic or endocrine cause. IPKH patients are often misdiagnosed as physiologically normal patients due to this inconclusive routine testing. IPKH is considered a disease of exclusion and should be distinguished from physiological ketotic hypoglycemia and other forms of pathological ketotic hypoglycemia. In certain cases, supervised fasting studies have been used to demonstrate the limited fasting tolerance seen in IPKH patients and have been used to support the diagnosis of IPKH after exclusion of other forms of pathological ketotic hypoglycemia.

== Signs and symptoms ==
Ketotic hypoglycemia classically presents in male young children, typically between the ages of 10 months and 6 years, in the morning after a prolonged overnight fast. Symptoms include those of neuroglycopenia, ketosis, or both. Neuroglycopenic symptoms usually include lethargy and malaise, but may include unresponsiveness or seizures. Common symptoms of ketosis are anorexia, abdominal discomfort, and nausea, sometimes progressing to vomiting. However, the diagnosis of ketotic hypoglycemia poses a challenge to clinicians, given how nonspecific symptoms can be and given that children in this age range are typically unable to describe their symptoms. Thin or smaller children may be more prone to episodes of ketotic hypoglycemia due to reduced fasting tolerance and minimal fat storage.

== Diagnosis ==
The advocacy organization Ketotic Hypoglycemia International defines pathologic ketotic hypoglycemia as recurrent, symptomatic episodes in which patients have beta-hydroxybutyrate levels ≥ 1.0 mmol/L and blood glucose levels < 70 mg/dL in the absence of triggers that would otherwise explain ketotic hypoglycemia. Useful diagnostic tests to aid in the diagnosis include measurement of insulin, growth hormone, cortisol, and lactic acid at the time of the hypoglycemia. Plasma acylcarnitine levels and urine organic acids can help exclude other metabolic diseases that could explain the presenting symptoms.

When the episodes are recurrent or severe, the definitive test is a hospitalization for a controlled diagnostic fast. The supervising clinician can then monitor glucose and beta-hydroxybutyrate levels throughout the course of the fast to generate an understanding of the child's fasting tolerance. If beta-hydroxybutyrate levels continue to excessively rise or remain persistently elevated, additional workup can be performed to detect ketone transporter defects.

While ketotic hypoglycemia can be definitively diagnosed in the inpatient setting, once diagnosis is established, parents can monitor frequency and duration of episodes at home using point-of-care glucose and ketone meters. If episodes are severe or frequent enough, continuous glucose monitoring (CGM) or continuous gastrostomy tube feeding, in which a feeding tube is directly inserted into the stomach, may become necessary.

== Treatment ==
The mainstay of physiologic ketotic hypoglycemia treatment typically includes management of the underlying cause, fluid resuscitation, and dietary supplementation of sugars and carbohydrates.

Alanine is a direct precursor in gluconeogenesis and can be used for treatment of ketotic hypoglycemia.

If an episode begins, affected children should be given fluids and carbohydrate-rich foods immediately, if swallowing is not compromised. A carbohydrate gel can be applied to the inside of the mouth in children who are unable to swallow. In children with severe symptoms and who seek treatment in the emergency or inpatient setting, intravenous glucose or dextrose can be given. In addition to glucose or dextrose, alanine — a precursor in gluconeogenesis — can also be infused to rapidly increase plasma glucose levels. Associated symptoms, such as nausea, vomiting, or abdominal pain, can be addressed as appropriate.

Once ketotic hypoglycemia has been diagnosed and other conditions excluded, long-term management aims to reduce the frequency and duration of episodes. Extended fasts should be avoided. Children should be given a bedtime snack rich in carbohydrates and should be awakened and fed after the usual duration of sleep. If the child is underweight, a daily nutritional supplement may be recommended. For children with ketotic hypoglycemia due to a glycogen storage disease, overnight cornstarch can help maintain blood glucose levels and reduce the incidence of hypoglycemic episodes.
