= Glycogen storage disease type III =

- Other names: Cori Disease, Debrancher Deficiency, Forbes Disease
- Micrograph of glycogen storage disease with histologic features consistent with Cori disease. Liver biopsy. H&E stain.
- Specialty: Endocrinology
- Symptoms: Hypotonia
- Causes: AGL gene mutation
- Diagnostic method: Biopsy, Elevated transaminases
- Treatment: Currently no cure, Diet regime

Glycogen storage disease type III (GSD III) is an autosomal recessive metabolic disorder and inborn error of metabolism (specifically of carbohydrates) characterized by a deficiency in glycogen debranching enzymes. It is also known as Cori's disease in honor of the 1947 Nobel laureates Carl Cori and Gerty Cori. Other names include Forbes disease in honor of clinician Gilbert Burnett Forbes (1915–2003), an American physician who further described the features of the disorder, or limit dextrinosis, due to the limit dextrin-like structures in cytosol. Limit dextrin is the remaining polymer produced after hydrolysis of glycogen. Without glycogen debranching enzymes to further convert these branched glycogen polymers to glucose, limit dextrinosis abnormally accumulates in the cytoplasm.

Glycogen is a molecule the body uses to store carbohydrate energy. Symptoms of GSD-III are caused by a deficiency of the enzyme amylo-1,6 glucosidase, or debrancher enzyme. This causes excess amounts of abnormal glycogen to be deposited in the liver, muscles, and, in some cases, the heart.

== Signs and symptoms ==
Glycogen storage disease type III presents during infancy with hypoglycemia and failure to thrive. Clinical examination usually reveals hepatomegaly. Muscular disease, including hypotonia and cardiomyopathy, usually occurs later. The liver pathology typically regresses as the individual enters adolescence, as does splenomegaly, should the individual develop it.

== Genetics ==
GSD III is AR

In regards to genetics glycogen storage disease type III is inherited in an autosomal recessive pattern (which means both parents need to be a carrier), and occurs in about 1 of every 100,000 live births. The highest incidence of glycogen storage disease type III is in the Faroe Islands where it occurs in 1 out of every 3,600 births, probably due to a founder effect.

There seem to be two mutations in exon 3 (c.17_18delAG) being one of them, which are linked to the subtype IIIb.

The amylo-alpha-1, 6-glucosidase, 4-alpha-glucanotransferase gene and its mutations, are at the root of this condition. The gene is responsible for creating glycogen debranching enzyme, which in turn helps in glycogen decomposition.

== Diagnosis ==
In terms of the diagnosis of glycogen storage disease type III, the following tests/exams are carried out to determine if the individual has the condition:

- Biopsy (muscle or liver)
- CBC
- Ultrasound
- DNA mutation analysis (helps ascertain GSD III subtype)

=== Differential diagnosis ===
The differential diagnosis of glycogen storage disease type III includes GSD I, GSD IX and GSD VI. This however does not mean other glycogen storage diseases should not be distinguished as well.

=== Classification ===
Clinical manifestations of glycogen storage disease type III are divided into four classes:

- GSD IIIa, is the most common, (along with GSD IIIb) and clinically includes muscle and liver involvement
- GSD IIIb, which clinically has liver involvement but no muscle involvement
- GSD IIIc which clinically affects liver and muscle.
- GSD IV affects the liver only (not muscle)

== Treatment ==
Glucose

Treatment for glycogen storage disease type III may involve a high-protein diet, to facilitate gluconeogenesis. Additionally the individual may need:

- IV glucose (if oral route is inadvisable)
- Nutritional specialist
- Vitamin D (for osteoporosis/secondary complication)
- Hepatic transplant (if a complication occurs)
