= Adult polyglucosan body disease =

Adult Polyglucosan Body Disease
- Other names: APBD, adult-onset GSD IV, adult GSD 4, GBE1-APBD, polyglucosan body neuropathy
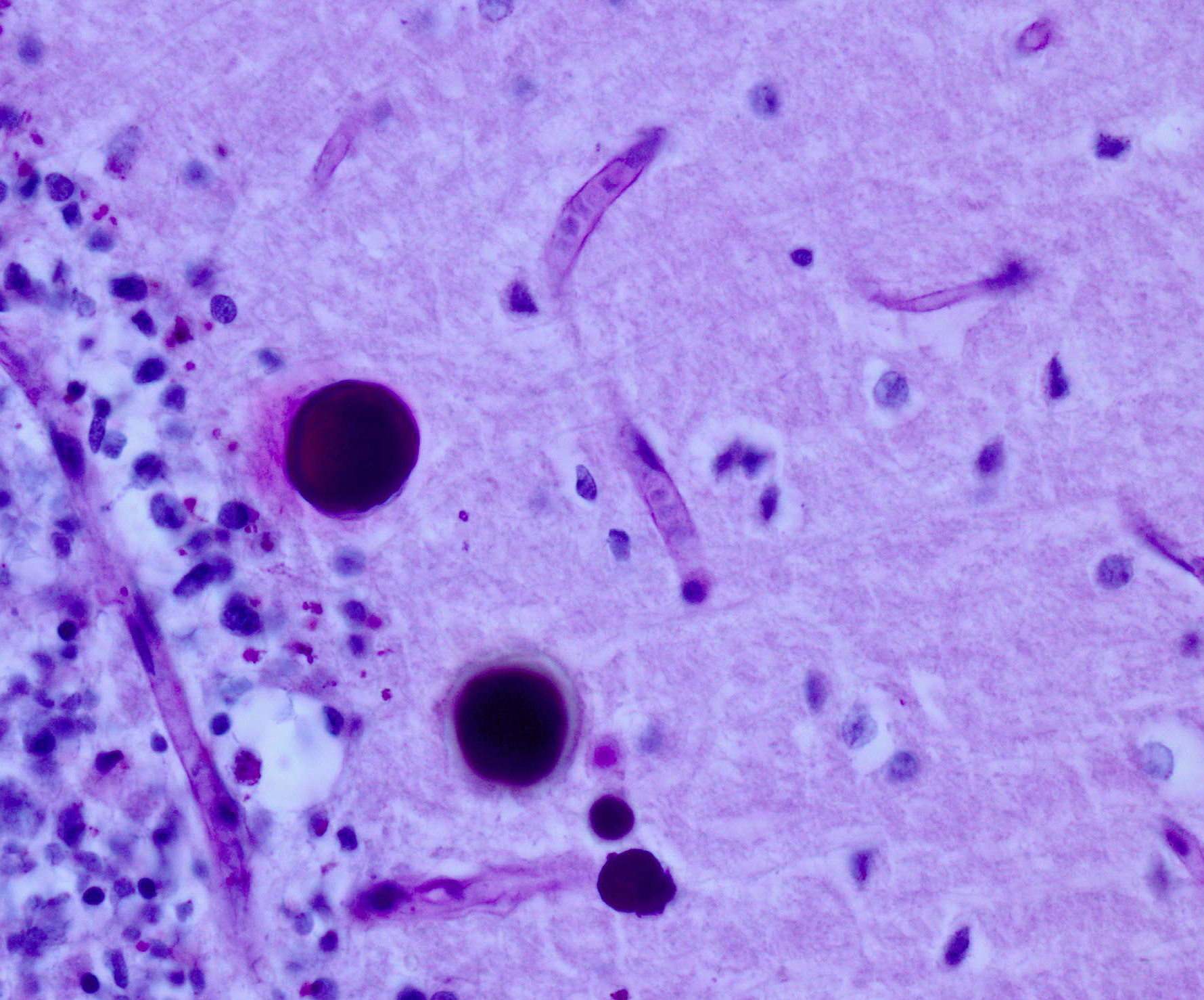
- Specialty: Medical genetics
- Symptoms: Progressive neurogenic bladder, gait difficulties, spasticity, weakness, neuropathy, autonomic dysfunction, and cognitive difficulties
- Usual onset: 30's-50's
- Causes: Genetic (autosomal recessive)
- Diagnostic method: Genetic testing
- Differential diagnosis: Multiple sclerosis, x-linked adrenomyeloneuropathy, adult-onset Alexander disease, hereditary spastic paraplegia
- Frequency: 0.0001%

Adult polyglucosan body disease (APBD) is a rare monogenic glycogen storage disorder (GSD type IV) caused by an inborn error of metabolism. Symptoms can emerge any time after the age of 30. Early symptoms often include trouble controlling urination, trouble walking, and muscle weakness. Most affected people eventually lose bladder control and the ability to walk or stand; some people eventually develop dementia.

A person inherits loss-of-function mutations in the GBE1 gene from each parent, and the lack of glycogen branching enzyme (the protein encoded by GBE1) leads to the buildup of unbranched glycogen in cells, which harms neurons more than other kinds of cells.

The condition is diagnosed by gathering symptoms, a neurological examination, laboratory tests including genetic testing, and medical imaging. As of 2025, there is no cure or treatment, but the symptoms can be managed. People diagnosed with APBD can live a long time after diagnosis, but will probably die earlier than people without the condition.

== Signs and symptoms ==
Adult polyglucosan body disease is a condition that affects the nervous system. People with this condition have problems walking due to reduced sensation in their legs (peripheral neuropathy) and progressive muscle weakness and stiffness (spasticity). Damage to the nerves that control bladder function (neurogenic bladder) causes progressive difficulty in controlling the flow of urine. About half of people with adult polyglucosan body disease experience dementia. Most people with the condition first complain of bladder issues.

People with adult polyglucosan body disease typically first experience signs and symptoms related to the condition between ages 30 and 60.

== Causes ==
When both parents are unaffected genetic carriers, then their children may develop APBD, may be unaffected carriers, or may be healthy children without the mutation.

APBD is an autosomal recessive disorder that is caused when a person inherits genes from both parents containing one or more loss-of-function mutations in the gene GBE1 which encodes for glycogen branching enzyme, also called 1,4-alpha-glucan-branching enzyme. According to reports, the most common disease-causing (pathogenic) variant of GBE1 that is associated with APBD, particularly among those of Ashkenazi Jewish descent, is the p.Tyr329Ser (c.986A>C) mutation.

== Mechanism ==
The GBE1 gene provides instructions for making the glycogen branching enzyme. This enzyme is involved in the production of a complex sugar called glycogen, which is a major source of stored energy in the body. Most GBE1 gene mutations result in a shortage (deficiency) of the glycogen branching enzyme, which leads to the production of abnormal glycogen molecules. called polyglucosan. Unlike normal glycogen, polyglucosan is made up of long, unbranched chains of glucose molecules. The lack of glycogen branching, which is controlled by the glycogen branching enzyme, makes the polyglucosan insoluble and difficult for the cell to metabolize. This results in the accumulation and aggregation of polyglucosan in the cell, forming polyglucosan bodies and causing cellular damage.

Neurons appear to be particularly vulnerable to the accumulation of polyglucosan bodies in people with this disorder, leading to impaired neuronal function. Polyglucosan can accumulate in other organs of the body; in children with GSD IV, polyglucosan accumulation can damage the liver, skeletal muscles, and heart.

Some mutations in the GBE1 gene that cause adult polyglucosan body disease do not result in a shortage of glycogen branching enzyme. In people with these mutations, the activity of this enzyme is normal. How mutations cause the disease in these individuals is unclear. Other people with adult polyglucosan body disease do not have identified mutations in the GBE1 gene. In these individuals, the cause of the disease is unknown.

== Diagnosis ==
Along with evaluation of the symptoms and a neurological examination, a diagnosis can be made based on genetic testing. Whether or not a person is making sufficient amounts of functional glycogen branching enzyme can be determined by taking a skin biopsy and testing for activity of the enzyme. Examination of tissue biopsied from the sural nerve under a microscope can reveal the presence of polyglucosan bodies. There will also be white matter changes visible in a magnetic resonance imaging scans.

=== Classification ===
Adult polyglucosan body disease is an orphan disease and a glycogen storage disorder that is caused by an inborn error of metabolism, that affects the central and peripheral nervous systems.

The condition in newborns and children caused by the same mutations is called glycogen storage disease type IV (GSD IV).

== Prevention ==
APBD can only be prevented if parents undergo genetic screening to understand their risk of producing a child with the condition; if in vitro fertilization is used, then preimplantation genetic diagnosis can be done to identify fertilized eggs that do not carry two copies of mutated GBE1.

== Management ==
As of 2024, there is no cure for APBD; instead symptoms are managed. There are various approaches to managing neurogenic bladder dysfunction, physical therapy and mobility aids to help with walking, and dementia can be managed with occupational therapy, counseling and drugs.

== Outcomes ==
The rate of progression varies significantly from person to person.

There is not good data on outcomes; it appears that APBD likely leads to earlier death, but people with APBD can live many years after diagnosis with relatively good quality of life.

== Epidemiology ==
The exact prevalence of APBD is unknown. As of 2025, global prevalence estimates from the Rare Genomes Project suggest that there are approximately 34,000 people worldwide with GBE1-related diseases (APBD and GSD IV). In addition, APBD and GBE1 mutations are most prevalent in individuals of Ashkenazi Jewish heritage (approximately 1/16,000). However, only about 160 cases of APBD had been reported in the medical literature as of 2020.

Historically, APBD and GSD IV have been classified as discrete diseases. However, detailed natural history and genome analysis studies have identified overlap in GBE1 gene mutations, as well as pathogenesis, between APBD and the GSD type IV variants.

== Society and culture ==
Gregory Weiss, a person with APBD, created the Adult Polyglucosan Body Disease Research Foundation to fund research into the disease and its management.

== Research directions ==
In 2015 the first transgenic mouse that appeared to be a useful model organism for studying APBD was published.

== See also ==
- GBE1
- Glycogen storage disease type IV
- Neurogenic bladder dysfunction
- Peripheral neuropathy
