= Modified cornstarch therapy =

Therapy for glycogen storage disease

Modified cornstarch therapy is a form of cornstarch used to treat glycogen storage disease. It is typically given at night to try to keep blood sugar levels from going low. Many children under one year of age, however, do not like uncooked cornstarch and other formulations are being studied.
