= Isoamylase =

Enzyme

Identifiers
- EC no.: 3.2.1.68
- CAS no.: 9067-73-6

Databases
- IntEnz: IntEnz view
- BRENDA: BRENDA entry
- ExPASy: NiceZyme view
- KEGG: KEGG entry
- MetaCyc: metabolic pathway
- PRIAM: profile
- PDB structures: RCSB PDB PDBe PDBsum
Search
- PMC: articles
- PubMed: articles
- NCBI: proteins

Isoamylase (EC 3.2.1.68, debranching enzyme, glycogen α-1,6-glucanohydrolase) is an enzyme with systematic name glycogen 6-α-D-glucanohydrolase. It catalyses the hydrolysis of (1→6)-α-D-glucosidic branch linkages in glycogen, amylopectin and their β-limit dextrins. It also readily hydrolyses amylopectin.

== See also ==
- Glycogen debranching enzyme
- DBR1
