= Glycogen storage disease type IV =

Human disease

- Other names: Andersen triad, Andersen disease,Adult Polyglucosan Body Disease,
- Glycogen
- Specialty: Endocrinology, medical genetics, hepatology

Glycogen storage disease type IV (GSD IV) is a form of glycogen storage disease, which is caused by an inborn error of metabolism. It is the result of a mutation in the GBE1 gene, which causes a defect in the glycogen branching enzyme. Therefore, glycogen is not made properly, and abnormal glycogen molecules, called polyglucosan, accumulate in cells. The polyglucosan may accumulate in the liver, skeletal muscle, heart, and/or nervous system and severity of the disease varies on the amount of enzyme produced. GSD IV is autosomal recessive, which means each parent has one mutant copy of the gene but shows no symptoms of the disease and males and females are equally likely to be affected. The GBE1 mutations can result in early-onset GSD IV (also called Andersen Disease) or adult-onset GSD IV (also called Adult Polyglucosan Body Disease). Classic Andersen Disease typically becomes apparent during the first few months after the patient is born, while other variants of GSD IV may develop in late childhood or adulthood. Approximately 1 in 20,000 to 25,000 newborns have a glycogen storage disease. GSD IV affects 1 in 236,000 individuals worldwide, with 3% of all GSDs being type IV. Andersen Disease was first described and studied in the 1950s by Dorothy Hansine Andersen, while Adult Polyglucosan Body Disease was first described in the 1980s by Robitaille and colleagues.

== Human pathology ==
GSD IV is a result of the absence of the glycogen branching enzyme, which is critical in the production of glycogen. This leads to very long, unbranched glucose chains being stored as polyglucosan. The long, unbranched molecules have low solubility, leading to polyglucosan precipitation in multiple organs, including the liver, muscles, heart, and nervous system. Due to it insolubility, polyglucosan cannot be metabolized properly for energy and accumulates into polyglucosan bodies, causing cell damage that can develop into liver damage/cirrhosis, muscle weakness, and fatigue, among other symptoms. The variations in the way the disease presents and develops has resulted in the classification of five types of early-onset GSD IV and the adult-onset APBD.

=== Variant types ===
==== Fatal perinatal neuromuscular type ====
- Excess fluid builds up around and in the body of the fetus
- Fetuses exhibit fetal akinesia deformation sequence
- Causes a decrease in fetal movement and stiffness of joints after birth
- Infants have low muscle tone and muscle wasting
- Do not survive past the newborn stage due to weakened heart and lungs

==== Congenital muscular type ====
- Develops in early infancy
- Babies have dilated cardiomyopathy, preventing the heart from pumping efficiently
- Only survive a few months

==== Progressive hepatic type ====
- Infants have difficulty gaining weight
- Develop enlarged liver and cirrhosis that is irreversible
- High BP in the hepatic portal vein and buildup of fluid in the abdominal cavity
- Die of liver failure in early childhood

==== Non-progressive hepatic type ====
- Same as progressive, but liver disease is not so severe
- Do not usually develop cirrhosis
- Usually shows muscle weakness and hypotonia
- Survive into adulthood
- Life expectancy varies upon symptom severity

==== Childhood neuromuscular type ====
- Develops in late childhood
- Has myopathy and dilated cardiomyopathy
- Varies greatly
- Some have mild muscle weakness
- Some have severe cardiomyopathy and die in early adulthood

==== Adult Polyglucosan Body Disease ====
- Develops in middle-late adulthood, progressive
- Affects nervous system
- Develop mobility and bladder function issues
- Some have cognitive dysfunction, fatigue, and other neurological symptoms

== Diagnosis ==
Following clinical evaluation of symptoms, the most definitive way to diagnose GSD IV is by genetic testing to identify disease-causing mutations in the GBE1 gene. Additional diagnostic tests and assays may be used to identify GSD IV. These tests include looking for the accumulation of polyglucosan in tissues, evaluating glycogen branching enzyme activity levels, clinical imaging (medical ultrasound, computed tomography, magnetic resonance imaging) of affected organs, measuring electrical activity in skeletal muscle(electromyography) or the heart (electrocardiogram), and other diagnostic testing.

== Treatments ==
As of 2025, there is no cure for GSD IV; treatment is focused on the management of symptoms. In variants of early-onset GSD IV that severely affect the liver (hepatic) or heart, organ transplantation may be considered; however, the long-term impact of organ transplantation on disease progression is unclear.

== Alternative names and related disease ==
Alternative names in medical literature for the disease include:

- Adult polyglucosan body disease (APBD)
- Amylopectinosis
- Andersen disease
- Andersen triad
- Andersen glycogenosis
- Brancher deficiency
- Branching enzyme deficiency
- Glycogenosis type IV
- Glycogen branching enzyme deficiency
- Polyglucosan body disease

== In other mammals ==
The form in horses is known as glycogen branching enzyme deficiency. It has been reported in American Quarter Horses and related breeds.

The disease has been reported in the Norwegian Forest Cat, where it causes skeletal muscle, heart, and CNS degeneration in animals greater than five months old. It has not been associated with cirrhosis or liver failure.
