= Phosphorylase kinase, alpha 1 =

Protein-coding gene in the species Homo sapiens

PHKA1

Identifiers
- Aliases: PHKA1, PHKA, Phosphorylase kinase, alpha 1, phosphorylase kinase regulatory subunit alpha 1
- External IDs: OMIM: 311870; MGI: 97576; HomoloGene: 1981; GeneCards: PHKA1; OMA:PHKA1 - orthologs

Gene location (Human)
| Chr. | X chromosome (human) |
| Band | Xq13.1 | Start | 72,578,814 bp |
| Band | Xq13.1 | End | 72,714,319 bp |

Gene location (Mouse)
| Chr. | X chromosome (mouse) |
| Band | X D|X 45.47 cM | Start | 101,557,581 bp |
| Band | X D|X 45.47 cM | End | 101,687,852 bp |
RNA expression pattern
| Bgee | Human / Mouse (ortholog); Top expressed in: gastrocnemius muscle; Skeletal muscle tissue of rectus abdominis; biceps brachii; vastus lateralis muscle; Skeletal muscle tissue of biceps brachii; muscle of thigh; deltoid muscle; tibialis anterior muscle; triceps brachii muscle; right adrenal cortex / Top expressed in: triceps brachii muscle; medial head of gastrocnemius muscle; vastus lateralis muscle; muscle of thigh; sternocleidomastoid muscle; temporal muscle; tibialis anterior muscle; digastric muscle; extensor digitorum longus muscle; masseter muscle; More reference expression data |
| BioGPS | n/a |
Gene ontology
| Molecular function | catalytic activity; calmodulin binding; phosphorylase kinase activity |
| Cellular component | cytosol; plasma membrane; membrane; phosphorylase kinase complex |
| Biological process | glycogen metabolic process; generation of precursor metabolites and energy; protein phosphorylation; carbohydrate metabolic process; glycogen catabolic process |
Sources:Amigo / QuickGO
Orthologs
| Species | Human | Mouse |
| Entrez | 5255 | 18679 |
| Ensembl | ENSG00000067177 | ENSMUSG00000034055 |
| UniProt | P46020 | P18826 |
| RefSeq (mRNA) | NM_001122670; NM_001172436; NM_002637 | NM_008832; NM_173021 |
| RefSeq (protein) | NP_001116142; NP_001165907; NP_002628 | NP_032858; NP_766609 |
| Location (UCSC) | Chr X: 72.58 – 72.71 Mb | Chr X: 101.56 – 101.69 Mb |
| PubMed search |
- Wikidata
| View/Edit Human | View/Edit Mouse |

Phosphorylase b kinase regulatory subunit alpha, skeletal muscle isoform is an enzyme that in humans is encoded by the PHKA1 gene. It is the muscle isoform of Phosphorylase kinase (PhK).

The PHKA1 gene encodes the alpha subunit of muscle phosphorylase kinase (EC 2.7.1.38), a key regulatory enzyme of glycogen metabolism. Phosphorylase kinase consists of 4 copies of an alpha-beta-gamma-delta tetramer. The alpha, beta (PHKB; MIM 172490), and gamma (PHKG1; MIM 172470 and PHKG2; MIM 172471) subunits have several isoforms; the delta subunit is calmodulin (CALM1; MIM 114180). PHKA2 (MIM 306000) encodes the alpha subunit of liver-specific phosphorylase kinase and is also located on the X chromosome.[supplied by OMIM]

A deficiency of this enzyme causes glycogen storage disease type IXd (GSD 9D).
