= Glycogen debranching enzyme =

Protein found in humans

AGL
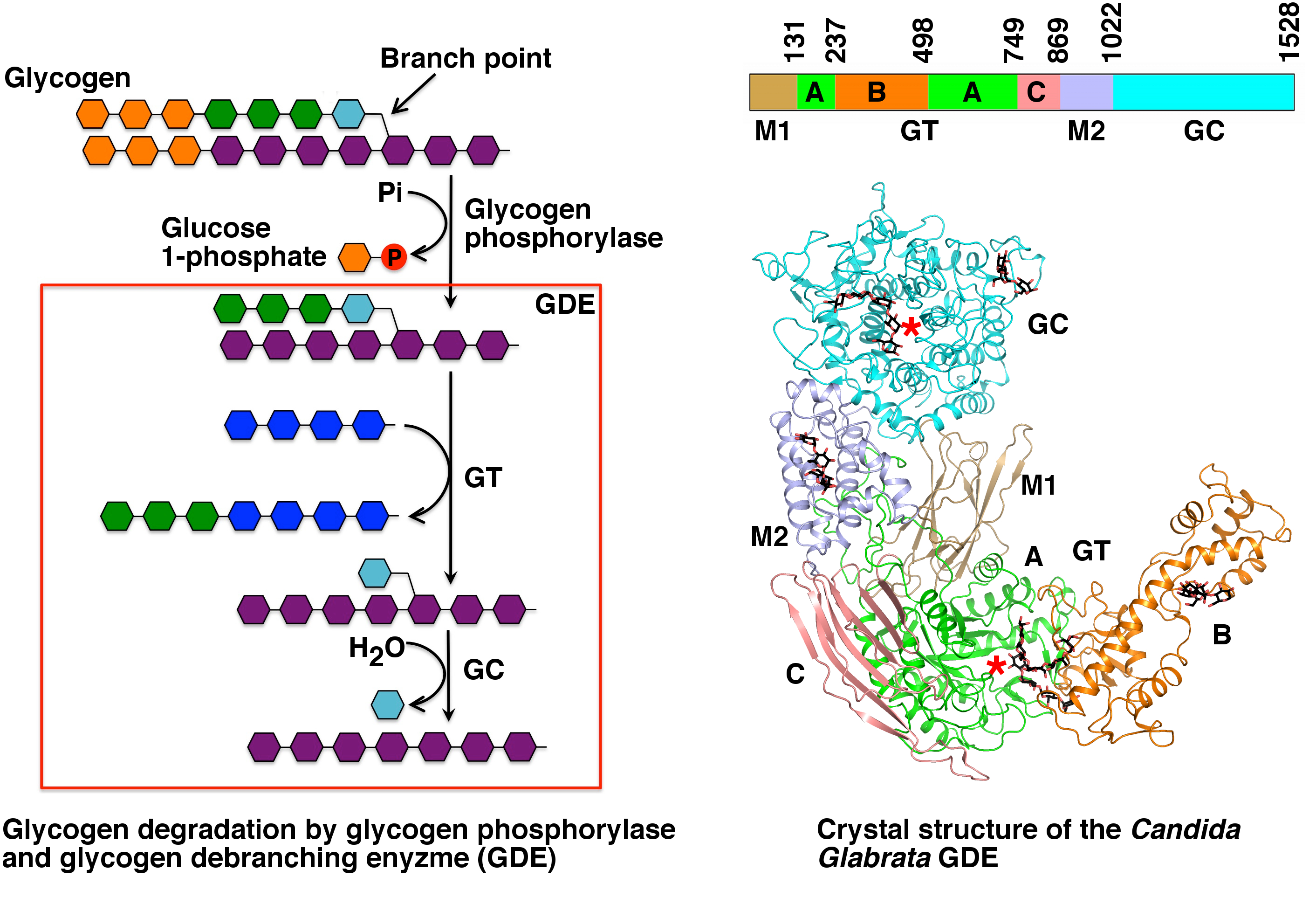

Identifiers
- Aliases: AGL, GDE, amylo-alpha-1, 6-glucosidase, 4-alpha-glucanotransferase
- External IDs: OMIM: 610860; MGI: 1924809; GeneCards: AGL
Enzyme activity
EC #	BRENDA	ExPASy	KEGG	MetaCyc
2.4.1.25	↗	↗	↗	↗
3.2.1.33	↗	↗	↗	↗

Gene location (Human)
Chr.	Chromosome 1 (human)
Band	1p21.2	Start	99,850,361 bp
Band	1p21.2	End	99,924,023 bp

Gene location (Mouse)
Chr.	Chromosome 3 (mouse)
Band	3|3 G1	Start	116,533,648 bp
Band	3|3 G1	End	116,601,815 bp
RNA expression pattern
Bgee	Human / Mouse (ortholog); Top expressed in: vastus lateralis muscle; biceps brachii; Skeletal muscle tissue of rectus abdominis; Skeletal muscle tissue of biceps brachii; thoracic diaphragm; body of tongue; triceps brachii muscle; deltoid muscle; glutes; tibialis anterior muscle / Top expressed in: muscle of thigh; triceps brachii muscle; vastus lateralis muscle; sternocleidomastoid muscle; temporal muscle; gastrocnemius muscle; medial head of gastrocnemius muscle; digastric muscle; intercostal muscle; tibialis anterior muscle; More reference expression data
BioGPS	n/a
Gene ontology
Molecular function	transferase activity; glycosyltransferase activity; hydrolase activity, acting on glycosyl bonds; protein binding; catalytic activity; hydrolase activity; 4-alpha-glucanotransferase activity; amylo-alpha-1,6-glucosidase activity; glycogen debranching enzyme activity; carbohydrate binding; polysaccharide binding; polyubiquitin modification-dependent protein binding; beta-maltose 4-alpha-glucanotransferase activity
Cellular component	cytoplasm; cytosol; isoamylase complex; extracellular region; secretory granule lumen; ficolin-1-rich granule lumen; nucleus; inclusion body; sarcoplasmic reticulum
Biological process	glycogen biosynthetic process; glycogen catabolic process; metabolism; neutrophil degranulation; glycogen metabolic process; response to nutrient; response to hormone; response to glucocorticoid
Sources:Amigo / QuickGO
Orthologs
Databases	NCBI: entry; OMA: entry
Species	Human	Mouse
Entrez	178	77559
Ensembl	ENSG00000162688	ENSMUSG00000033400
UniProt	P35573	n/a
RefSeq (mRNA)	NM_000028; NM_000642; NM_000643; NM_000644; NM_000645 NM_000646	NM_001081326; NM_001362367
RefSeq (protein)	NP_000019; NP_000633; NP_000634; NP_000635; NP_000637	n/a
Location (UCSC)	Chr 1: 99.85 – 99.92 Mb	Chr 3: 116.53 – 116.6 Mb
PubMed search
- Wikidata
View/Edit Human	View/Edit Mouse

The glycogen debranching enzyme, in humans, is the protein encoded by the gene AGL. This enzyme is essential for the breakdown of glycogen, which serves as a store of glucose in the body. It has separate glucosyltransferase and glucosidase activities.

Together with phosphorylases, the enzyme mobilize glucose reserves from glycogen deposits in the muscles and liver. This constitutes a major source of energy reserves in most organisms. Glycogen breakdown is highly regulated in the body, especially in the liver, by various hormones including insulin and glucagon, to maintain a homeostatic balance of blood-glucose levels. When glycogen breakdown is compromised by mutations in the glycogen debranching enzyme, metabolic diseases such as Glycogen storage disease type III can result.

The two steps of glycogen breakdown, glucosyltransferase and glucosidase, are performed by a single enzyme in mammals, yeast, and some bacteria, but by two distinct enzymes in E. coli and other bacteria, complicating nomenclature. Proteins that catalyze both functions are referred to as glycogen debranching enzymes (GDEs). When glucosyltransferase and glucosidase are catalyzed by distinct enzymes, glycogen debranching enzyme usually refers to the glucosidase enzyme. In some literature, an enzyme capable only of glucosidase is referred to as a debranching enzyme.

== Function ==
Together with phosphorylase, glycogen debranching enzymes function in glycogen breakdown and glucose mobilization. When phosphorylase has digested a glycogen branch down to four glucose residues, it will not remove further residues. Glycogen debranching enzymes assist phosphorylase, the primary enzyme involved in glycogen breakdown, in the mobilization of glycogen stores. Phosphorylase can only cleave α-1,4-glycosidic bond between adjacent glucose molecules in glycogen but branches also exist as α-1,6 linkages. When phosphorylase reaches four residues from a branching point it stops cleaving; because 1 in 10 residues is branched, cleavage by phosphorylase alone would not be sufficient in mobilizing glycogen stores. Before phosphorylase can resume catabolism, debranching enzymes perform two functions:

- 4-α-D-glucanotransferase (EC 2.4.1.25), or glucosyltransferase, transfers three glucose residues from the four-residue glycogen branch to a nearby branch. This exposes a single glucose residue joined to the glucose chain through an α-1,6 glycosidic linkage
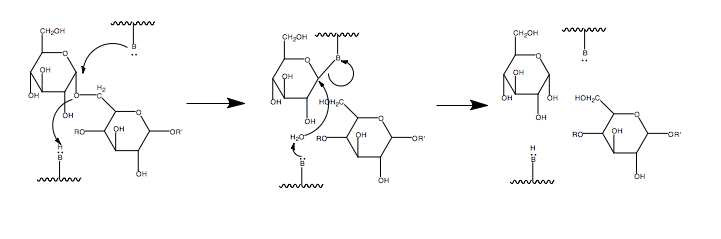
- Mechanism for cleaving of alpha-1,6 linkage
  Amylo-α-1,6-glucosidase (EC 3.2.1.33), or glucosidase, cleaves the remaining alpha-1,6 linkage, producing glucose and a linear chain of glycogen. The mechanism by which the glucosidase cleaves the α -1,6-linkage is not fully known because the amino acids in the active site have not yet been identified. It is thought to proceed through a two step acid base assistance type mechanism, with an oxocarbenium ion intermediate, and retention of configuration in glucose. This is a common method through which to cleave bonds, with an acid below the site of hydrolysis to lend a proton and a base above to deprotinate a water which can then act as a nucleophile. These acids and bases are amino acid side chains in the active site of the enzyme. A scheme for the mechanism is shown in the figure.

Thus the debranching enzymes, transferase and α-1,6-glucosidase converts the branched glycogen structure into a linear one, paving the way for further cleavage by phosphorylase.

4-α-glucanotransferase

Identifiers
- EC no.: 2.4.1.25
- CAS no.: 9032-09-1

Databases
- BRENDA: enzyme data
- ExPASy: NiceZyme view
- KEGG: enzyme entry
- MetaCyc: metabolic pathway
- Rhea: reactions
- PDB structures: RCSB PDB PDBe PDBsum
- Gene Ontology: AmiGO / QuickGO
Search
- PMC: articles
- PubMed: articles
- NCBI: proteins

amylo-α-1,6-glucosidase

Identifiers
- EC no.: 3.2.1.33
- CAS no.: 9012-47-9

Databases
- BRENDA: enzyme data
- ExPASy: NiceZyme view
- KEGG: enzyme entry
- MetaCyc: metabolic pathway
- Rhea: reactions
- PDB structures: RCSB PDB PDBe PDBsum
- Gene Ontology: AmiGO / QuickGO
Search
- PMC: articles
- PubMed: articles
- NCBI: proteins

== Structure and activity ==
=== Two enzymes ===
In E. coli and other bacteria, glucosyltransferase and glucosidase functions are performed by two distinct proteins. In E. coli, Glucose transfer is performed by 4-alpha-glucanotransferase, a 78.5 kDa protein coded for by the gene malQ. A second protein, referred to as debranching enzyme, performs α-1,6-glucose cleavage. This enzyme has a molecular mass of 73.6 kDa, and is coded for by the gene glgX. Activity of the two enzymes is not always necessarily coupled. In E. coli glgX selectively catalyzes the cleavage of 4-subunit branches, without the action of glucanotransferase. The product of this cleavage, maltotetraose, is further degraded by maltodextrin phosphorylase.

E. coli GlgX is structurally similar to the protein isoamylase. The monomeric protein contains a central domain in which eight parallel beta-strands are surrounded by eight parallel alpha strands. Notable within this structure is a groove 26 angstroms long and 9 angstroms wide, containing aromatic residues that are thought to stabilize a four-glucose branch before cleavage.

The glycogen-degrading enzyme of the archaea Sulfolobus solfataricus, treX, provides an interesting example of using a single active site for two activities: amylosidase and glucanotransferase activities. TreX is structurally similar to glgX, and has a mass of 80kD and one active site. Unlike either glgX, however, treX exists as a dimer and tetramer in solution. TreX's oligomeric form seems to play a significant role in altering both enzyme shape and function. Dimerization is thought to stabilize a "flexible loop" located close to the active site. This may be key to explaining why treX (and not glgX) shows glucosyltransferase activity. As a tetramer, the catalytic efficiency of treX is increased fourfold over its dimeric form.

=== One enzyme with two catalytic sites ===
In mammals and yeast, a single enzyme performs both debranching functions. The human glycogen debranching enzyme (gene: AGL) is a monomer with a molecular weight of 175 kDa. It has been shown that the two catalytic actions of AGL can function independently of each other, demonstrating that multiple active sites are present. This idea has been reinforced with inhibitors of the active site, such as polyhydroxyamine, which were found to inhibit glucosidase activity while transferase activity was not measurably changed. Glycogen debranching enzyme is the only known eukaryotic enzyme that contains multiple catalytic sites and is active as a monomer.

Some studies have shown that the C-terminal half of yeast GDE is associated with glucosidase activity, while the N-terminal half is associated with glucosyltransferase activity. In addition to these two active sites, AGL appears to contain a third active site that allows it to bind to a glycogen polymer. It is thought to bind to six glucose molecules of the chain as well as the branched glucose, thus corresponding to 7 subunits within the active site, as shown in the figure below.

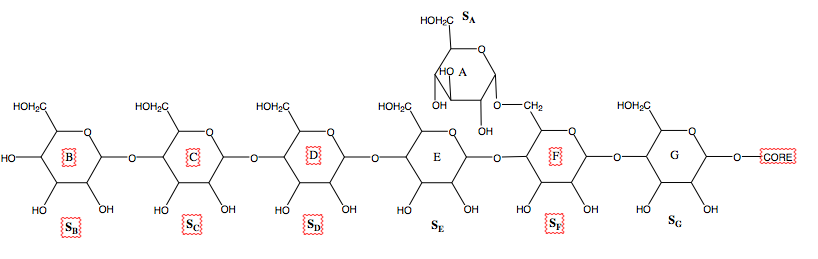
Hypothesized sidechain binding sites

The structure of the Candida glabrata GDE has been reported. The structure revealed that distinct domains in GDE encode the glucanotransferase and glucosidase activities. Their catalyses are similar to that of alpha-amylase and glucoamylase, respectively. Their active sites are selective towards the respective substrates, ensuring proper activation of GDE. Besides the active sites GDE have additional binding sites for glycogen, which are important for its recruitment to glycogen. Mapping the disease-causing mutations onto the GDE structure provided insights into glycogen storage disease type III.

== Genetic location ==
The official name for the gene is "amylo-α-1,6-glucosidase, 4-α-glucanotransferase", with the official symbol AGL. AGL is an autosomal gene found on chromosome 1p21. The AGL gene provides instructions for making several different versions, known as isoforms, of the glycogen debranching enzyme. These isoforms vary by size and are expressed in different tissues, such as liver and muscle. This gene has been studied in great detail, because mutation at this gene is the cause of Glycogen Storage Disease Type III. The gene is 85 kb long, has 35 exons and encodes for a 7.0 kb mRNA. Translation of the gene begins at exon 3, which encodes for the first 27 amino acids of the AGL gene, because the first two exons (68kb) contain the 5' untranslated region. Exons 4-35 encode the remaining 1505 amino acids of the AGL gene. Studies produced by the department of pediatrics at Duke University suggest that the human AGL gene contains at minimum 2 promotor regions, sites where the transcription of the gene begins, that result in differential expression of isoform, different forms of the same protein, mRNAs in a manner that is specific for different tissues.

== Clinical significance ==
When GDE activity is compromised, the body cannot effectively release stored glycogen, type III Glycogen Storage Disease (debrancher deficiency), an autosomal recessive disorder, can result. In GSD III glycogen breakdown is incomplete and there is accumulation of abnormal glycogen with short outer branches.

Most patients exhibit GDE defiency in both liver and muscle (Type IIIa), although 15% of patients have retained GDE in muscle while having it absent from the liver (Type IIIb). Depending on mutation location, different mutations in the AGL gene can affect different isoforms of the gene expression. For example, mutations that occur on exon 3, affect the form which affect the isoform that is primarily expressed in the liver; this would lead to GSD type III.

These different manifestation produce varied symptoms, which can be nearly indistinguishable from Type I GSD, including hepatomegaly, hypoglycemia in children, short stature, myopathy, and cardiomyopathy. Type IIIa patients often exhibit symptoms related to liver disease and progressive muscle involvement, with variations caused by age of onset, rate of disease progression and severity. Patients with Type IIIb generally symptoms related to liver disease. Type III patients be distinguished by elevated liver enzymes, with normal uric acid and blood lactate levels, differing from other forms of GSD. In patients with muscle involvement, Type IIIa, the muscle weakness becomes predominant into adulthood and can lead to ventricular hypertrophy and distal muscle wasting.
