= DBR1 =

Protein-coding gene in the species Homo sapiens

Identifiers
- Aliases: DBR1, debranching RNA lariats 1
- External IDs: OMIM: 607024; MGI: 1931520; HomoloGene: 9428; GeneCards: DBR1; OMA:DBR1 - orthologs

Gene location (Human)
Chr.	Chromosome 3 (human)
Band	3q22.3	Start	138,160,988 bp
Band	3q22.3	End	138,174,921 bp

Gene location (Mouse)
Chr.	Chromosome 9 (mouse)
Band	9|9 E3.3	Start	99,457,852 bp
Band	9|9 E3.3	End	99,466,554 bp
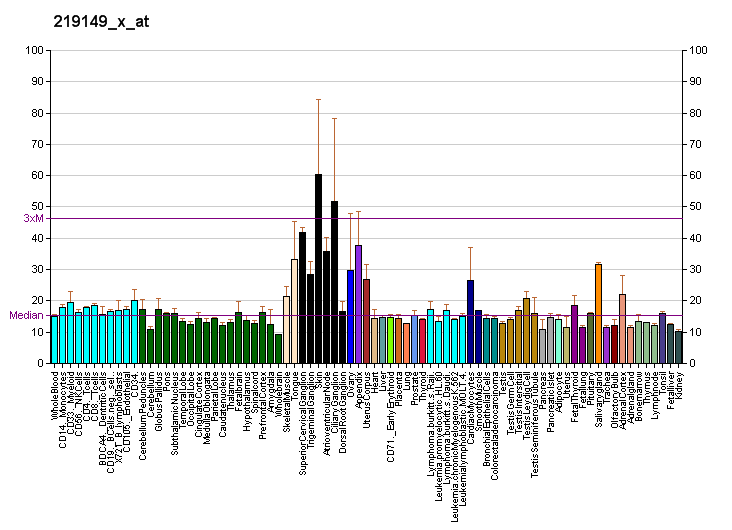
RNA expression pattern
Bgee	Human / Mouse (ortholog); Top expressed in: buccal mucosa cell; Achilles tendon; tendon of biceps brachii; amniotic fluid; germinal epithelium; gonad; epithelium of nasopharynx; ganglionic eminence; islet of Langerhans; ventricular zone / Top expressed in: primitive streak; epiblast; abdominal wall; hair follicle; medial ganglionic eminence; trigeminal ganglion; maxillary prominence; motor neuron; endothelial cell of lymphatic vessel; mandibular prominence; More reference expression data
BioGPS	More reference expression data
Gene ontology
Molecular function	hydrolase activity; RNA lariat debranching enzyme activity; hydrolase activity, acting on ester bonds; metal ion binding; RNA binding
Cellular component	nucleus; nucleoplasm
Biological process	RNA splicing, via transesterification reactions; mRNA splicing, via spliceosome; mRNA processing; RNA phosphodiester bond hydrolysis, endonucleolytic
Sources:Amigo / QuickGO
Orthologs
Species	Human	Mouse
Entrez	51163	83703
Ensembl	ENSG00000138231	ENSMUSG00000032469
UniProt	Q9UK59	Q923B1
RefSeq (mRNA)	NM_016216	NM_031403; NM_001368298
RefSeq (protein)	NP_057300	NP_113580; NP_001355227
Location (UCSC)	Chr 3: 138.16 – 138.17 Mb	Chr 9: 99.46 – 99.47 Mb
PubMed search
- Wikidata
View/Edit Human	View/Edit Mouse

Lariat debranching enzyme is a protein that in humans is encoded by the DBR1 gene.

The RNA lariat debranching enzyme, or DBR1, specifically hydrolyzes 2-prime-to-5-prime branched phosphodiester bonds at the branch point of excised lariat intron RNA and converts them into linear molecules.[supplied by OMIM]
