= PHKA2 =

Protein-coding gene in the species Homo sapiens

Identifiers
- Aliases: PHKA2, GSD9A, PHK, PYK, PYKL, XLG, XLG2, phosphorylase kinase regulatory subunit alpha 2
- External IDs: OMIM: 300798; MGI: 97577; HomoloGene: 246; GeneCards: PHKA2; OMA:PHKA2 - orthologs

Gene location (Human)
Chr.	X chromosome (human)
Band	Xp22.13	Start	18,892,298 bp
Band	Xp22.13	End	18,984,114 bp

Gene location (Mouse)
Chr.	X chromosome (mouse)
Band	X F4|X 73.95 cM	Start	159,285,162 bp
Band	X F4|X 73.95 cM	End	159,381,874 bp
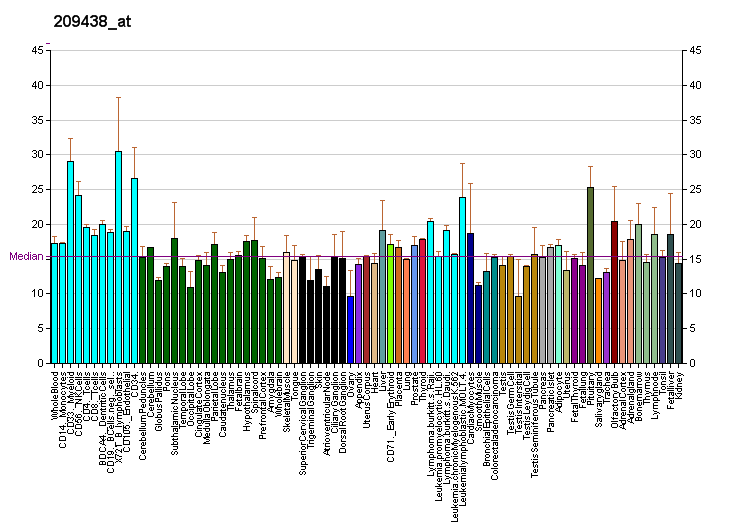

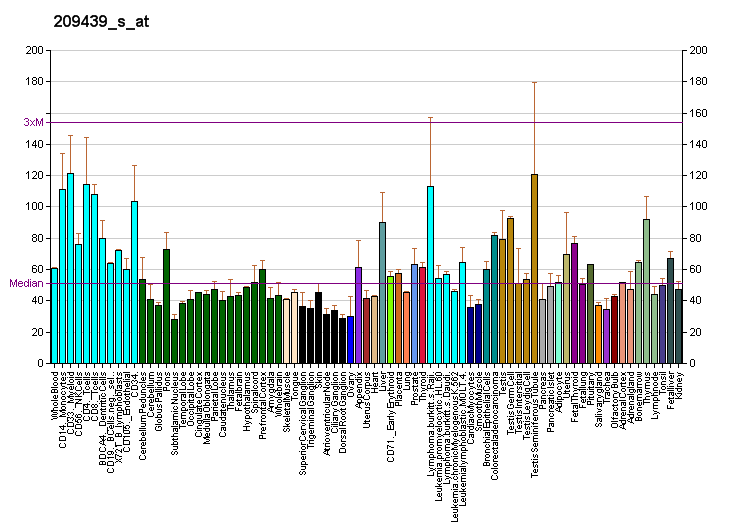
RNA expression pattern
Bgee	Human / Mouse (ortholog); Top expressed in: right lobe of liver; right uterine tube; apex of heart; left ovary; body of pancreas; pituitary gland; anterior pituitary; right ovary; left lobe of thyroid gland; right lobe of thyroid gland / Top expressed in: brown adipose tissue; tail of embryo; subcutaneous adipose tissue; white adipose tissue; genital tubercle; right ventricle; stroma of bone marrow; tunica adventitia of aorta; tibiofemoral joint; internal carotid artery; More reference expression data
BioGPS	More reference expression data
Gene ontology
Molecular function	catalytic activity; calmodulin binding; phosphorylase kinase activity; protein binding
Cellular component	cytosol; plasma membrane; membrane; phosphorylase kinase complex
Biological process	glycogen metabolic process; protein phosphorylation; generation of precursor metabolites and energy; carbohydrate metabolic process; glycogen catabolic process
Sources:Amigo / QuickGO
Orthologs
Species	Human	Mouse
Entrez	5256	110094
Ensembl	ENSG00000044446	ENSMUSG00000031295
UniProt	P46019	Q8BWJ3
RefSeq (mRNA)	NM_000292	NM_001177878; NM_001177879; NM_172783; NM_001358966; NM_001358968
RefSeq (protein)	NP_000283	NP_001171349; NP_001171350; NP_766371; NP_001345895; NP_001345897
Location (UCSC)	Chr X: 18.89 – 18.98 Mb	Chr X: 159.29 – 159.38 Mb
PubMed search
- Wikidata
View/Edit Human	View/Edit Mouse

Phosphorylase b kinase regulatory subunit alpha, liver isoform is an enzyme that in humans is encoded by the PHKA2 gene.
