= Glycogen branching enzyme =

Mammalian protein involved in glycogen production

GBE1

Identifiers
- Aliases: GBE1, APBD, GBE, GSD4, glucan (1,4-alpha-), branching enzyme 1, 1,4-alpha-glucan branching enzyme 1
- External IDs: OMIM: 607839; MGI: 1921435; GeneCards: GBE1
Available structures
PDB	Ortholog search: PDBe RCSB
PDB	List of PDB id codes 4BZY, 5CLT, 5CLW
Enzyme activity
EC #	BRENDA	ExPASy	KEGG	MetaCyc
2.4.1.18	↗	↗	↗	↗

Gene location (Human)
Chr.	Chromosome 3 (human)
Band	3p12.2	Start	81,489,703 bp
Band	3p12.2	End	81,761,645 bp

Gene location (Mouse)
Chr.	Chromosome 16 (mouse)
Band	16 C2|16 40.19 cM	Start	70,110,837 bp
Band	16 C2|16 40.19 cM	End	70,366,604 bp
RNA expression pattern
Bgee	Human / Mouse (ortholog); Top expressed in: glutes; tibialis anterior muscle; biceps brachii; deltoid muscle; Epithelium of choroid plexus; Skeletal muscle tissue of biceps brachii; myocardium of left ventricle; right ventricle; tibia; kidney tubule / Top expressed in: intercostal muscle; brown adipose tissue; granulocyte; soleus muscle; digastric muscle; muscle of thigh; left lobe of liver; tunica adventitia of aorta; tibialis anterior muscle; plantaris muscle; More reference expression data
BioGPS	n/a
Gene ontology
Molecular function	transferase activity; hydrolase activity, hydrolyzing O-glycosyl compounds; catalytic activity; cation binding; glycosyltransferase activity; carbohydrate binding; 1,4-alpha-glucan branching enzyme activity; protein binding; 1,4-alpha-glucan branching enzyme activity (using a glucosylated glycogenin as primer for glycogen synthesis)
Cellular component	cytosol; extracellular exosome
Biological process	glycogen metabolic process; generation of precursor metabolites and energy; glycogen biosynthetic process; carbohydrate metabolic process
Sources:Amigo / QuickGO
Orthologs
Databases	NCBI: entry; OMA: entry
Species	Human	Mouse
Entrez	2632	74185
Ensembl	ENSG00000114480	ENSMUSG00000022707
UniProt	Q04446	Q9D6Y9
RefSeq (mRNA)	NM_000158	NM_028803
RefSeq (protein)	NP_000149	NP_083079
Location (UCSC)	Chr 3: 81.49 – 81.76 Mb	Chr 16: 70.11 – 70.37 Mb
PubMed search
- Wikidata
View/Edit Human	View/Edit Mouse

Glycogen branching enzyme

Identifiers
- EC no.: 2.4.1.18
- CAS no.: 9001-97-2

Databases
- BRENDA: enzyme data
- ExPASy: NiceZyme view
- KEGG: enzyme entry
- MetaCyc: metabolic pathway
- Rhea: reactions
- PDB structures: RCSB PDB PDBe PDBsum
- Gene Ontology: AmiGO / QuickGO
Search
- PMC: articles
- PubMed: articles
- NCBI: proteins

1,4-α-glucan-branching enzyme, also known as brancher enzyme or glycogen-branching enzyme, is an enzyme that in humans is encoded by the GBE1 gene.

Glycogen branching enzyme is an enzyme that adds branches to the growing glycogen molecule during the synthesis of glycogen, a storage form of glucose. More specifically, during glycogen synthesis, a glucose 1-phosphate molecule reacts with uridine triphosphate (UTP) to become UDP-glucose, an activated form of glucose. The activated glucosyl unit of UDP-glucose is then transferred to the hydroxyl group at the C-4 of a terminal residue of glycogen to form an α-1,4-glycosidic linkage, a reaction catalyzed by glycogen synthase. Importantly, glycogen synthase can only catalyze the synthesis of α-1,4-glycosidic linkages. Since glycogen is a readily mobilized storage form of glucose, the extended glycogen polymer is branched by glycogen branching enzyme to provide glycogen breakdown enzymes, such as glycogen phosphorylase, with many terminal residues for rapid degradation. Branching also importantly increases the solubility and decreases the osmotic strength of glycogen.

The protein encoded by this gene is a glycogen branching enzyme that catalyzes the transfer of α-1,4-linked glucosyl units from the outer end of a glycogen chain to an α-1,6 position on the same or a neighboring glycogen chain. Branching of the chains is essential to increase the solubility of the glycogen molecule and, consequently, in reducing the osmotic pressure within cells. The highest levels of this enzyme are found in liver and muscle cells. Mutations in this gene are associated with glycogen storage disease type IV (also known as Andersen's disease).

== Nomenclature ==
This enzyme belongs to the family of transferases, to be specific, those glycosyltransferases that transfer hexoses (hexosyltransferases). The systematic name of this enzyme class is 1,4-α-D-glucan:1,4-α-D-glucan 6-α-D-(1,4-α-D-glucano)-transferase. Other names in common use include branching enzyme, amylo-(1,4→1,6)-transglycosylase, Q-enzyme, α-glucan-branching glycosyltransferase, amylose isomerase, enzymatic branching factor, branching glycosyltransferase, enzyme Q, glucosan transglycosylase, 1,4-α-glucan branching enzyme 1, plant branching enzyme, α-1,4-glucan:α-1,4-glucan-6-glycosyltransferase, and starch branching enzyme. This enzyme participates in starch and sucrose metabolism.

== Gene ==
GBE is encoded by the GBE1 gene.

Through Southern blot analysis of DNA derived from human/rodent somatic cell hybrids, GBE1 has been identified as an autosomal gene located on the short arm of chromosome 3 at position 12.3. The human GBE gene was also isolated by a function complementation of the Saccharomyces cerevisiae GBE deficiency. From the isolated cDNA, the length of the gene was found to be approximately 3 kb. Additionally, the coding sequence was found to comprise 2,106 base pairs and encode a 702-amino acid long GBE. The molecular mass of human GBE was calculated to be 80,438 Da.

== Structure ==
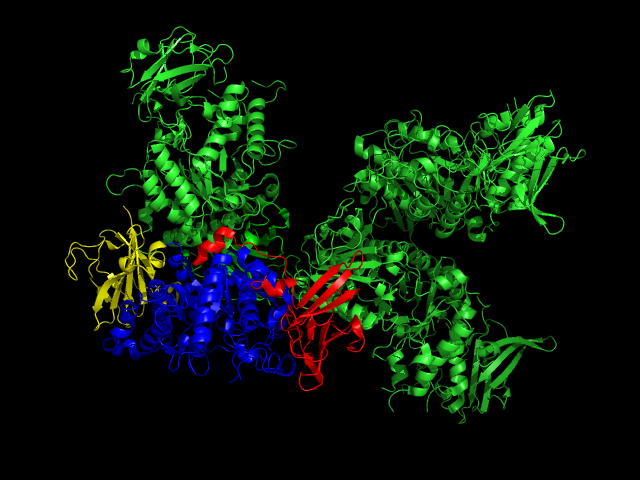
Structure of glycogen branching enzyme found in E. Coli

Glycogen branching enzyme belongs to the α-amylase family of enzymes, which include α-amylases, pullulanas/isoamylase, cyclodextrin glucanotransferase (CGT), and branching enzyme. Shown by x-ray crystallography, glycogen branching enzyme has four marginally asymmetric units each that are organized into three domains: an amino-terminal domain, involved in determining the length of the chain transfer, a carboxyl-terminal domain, involved in substrate preference and catalytic capacity, and a central (α/β) barrel catalytic domain. The amino-terminal domain consists of 128 residues arranged in seven β-strands, the carboxyl-terminal domain with 116 residues also organized in seven β-strands, and the (α/β) barrel domain with 372 residues. While the central (α/β) barrel domain is common in members of the α-amylase family, numerous variations exist between the various barrel domains. Additionally, there are striking differences between the loops connecting elements of the secondary structure among these various α-amylase members, especially around the active site. In comparison to the other family members, glycogen binding enzyme has shorter loops, which result in a more open cavity, favorable to the binding of a bulkier substrate such as branched sugar. Through primary structure analysis and the x-ray crystallographic structures of the members of the α-amylase family, seven residue were conserved, Asp335, His340, Arg403, Asp 405, Glu458, His525, and Asp526 (E coli. numbering). These residues are implicated in catalysis and substrate binding.

Glycogen binding enzymes in other organisms have also been crystallized and structurally determined, demonstrating both similarity and variation to GBE found in Escherichia coli.

== Function ==
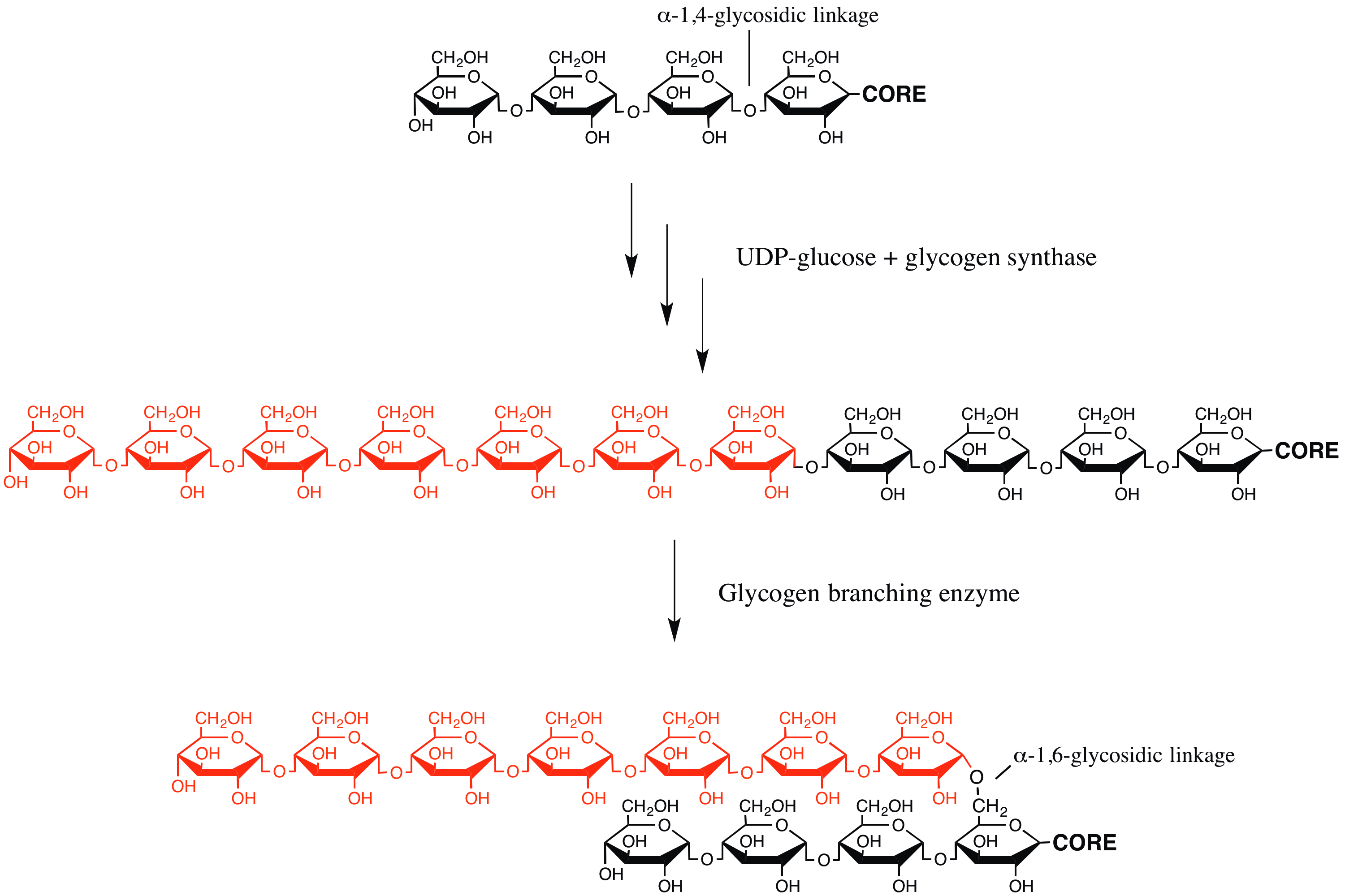
Scheme demonstrating the function of glycogen branching enzyme

In glycogen, every 10 to 14 glucose units, a side branch with an additional chain of glucose units occurs. The side chain attaches at carbon atom 6 of a glucose unit, an α-1,6-glycosidic bond. This connection is catalyzed by a branching enzyme, generally given the name α-glucan branching enzyme. A branching enzyme attaches a string of seven glucose units (with some minor variation to this number) to the carbon at the C-6 position on the glucose unit, forming the α-1,6-glycosidic bond. The specific nature of this enzyme means that this chain of 7 carbons is usually attached to a glucose molecule that is in position three from the non-reducing end of another chain. Because the enzyme works with such specificity regarding the number of glucose units transferred and the position to which they are transferred, the enzyme creates the very characteristic, highly branched glycogen molecule.

== Clinical significance ==
Mutations in this gene are associated with glycogen storage disease type IV (also known as Andersen's disease) in newborns and with adult polyglucosan body disease.

Approximately 40 mutations in the GBE1 gene, most resulting in a point mutation in the glycogen branching enzyme, have led to the early childhood disorder, glycogen storage disease type IV (GSD IV). This disease is characterized by a severe depletion or complete absence of GBE, resulting in the accumulation of abnormally structured glycogen, known as polyglucosan bodies. Glycogen buildup leads to increased osmotic pressure resulting in cellular swelling and death. The tissues most affected by this disease are the liver, heart, and neuromuscular system, areas with the greatest levels of glycogen accumulation. Abnormal glycogen buildup in the liver interferes with liver functioning and can result in an enlarged liver and liver disease. In muscles, the inability of cells to efficiently breakdown glycogen due to the severe reduction or absence of branching can lead to muscle weakness and atrophy. At least three mutations in the GBE1 gene have been found to cause another disease called adult polyglucosan body disease (APBD). While in GSD IV GBE activity is undetectable or minimally detectable, APBD is characterized by reduced or even normal GBE activity. In this disease, abnormal glycogen can build up in neurons leading to a spectrum of problems. Specifically, some disease characteristics are gait difficulties from mixed upper and lower motor neuron involvement sensory loss in lower extremities, and neurogenic bladder, a problem in which a person lacks bladder control due to a brain, spinal cord, or nerve condition.
