= PHKB =

Protein-coding gene in the species Homo sapiens

Identifiers
- Aliases: PHKB, phosphorylase kinase regulatory subunit beta
- External IDs: OMIM: 172490; MGI: 97578; HomoloGene: 247; GeneCards: PHKB; OMA:PHKB - orthologs

Gene location (Human)
Chr.	Chromosome 16 (human)
Band	16q12.1	Start	47,461,123 bp
Band	16q12.1	End	47,701,523 bp

Gene location (Mouse)
Chr.	Chromosome 8 (mouse)
Band	8 C3|8 41.61 cM	Start	86,567,588 bp
Band	8 C3|8 41.61 cM	End	86,788,005 bp
RNA expression pattern
Bgee	Human / Mouse (ortholog); Top expressed in: vastus lateralis muscle; biceps brachii; muscle of leg; gastrocnemius muscle; sperm; muscle of thigh; skeletal muscle tissue; renal medulla; right adrenal cortex; superior surface of tongue / Top expressed in: quadriceps femoris muscle; triceps brachii muscle; vastus lateralis muscle; gastrocnemius muscle; medial head of gastrocnemius muscle; muscle of thigh; tibialis anterior muscle; sternocleidomastoid muscle; skeletal muscle tissue; temporal muscle; More reference expression data
BioGPS	n/a
Gene ontology
Molecular function	phosphorylase kinase activity; calmodulin binding; catalytic activity; protein binding
Cellular component	cytosol; plasma membrane; membrane; phosphorylase kinase complex
Biological process	protein phosphorylation; glycogen metabolic process; generation of precursor metabolites and energy; carbohydrate metabolic process; glycogen catabolic process
Sources:Amigo / QuickGO
Orthologs
Species	Human	Mouse
Entrez	5257	102093
Ensembl	ENSG00000102893	ENSMUSG00000036879
UniProt	Q93100	Q7TSH2
RefSeq (mRNA)	NM_000293; NM_001031835; NM_001363837	NM_199446; NM_001364411; NM_001364412
RefSeq (protein)	NP_000284; NP_001027005; NP_001350766	NP_955517; NP_001351340; NP_001351341; NP_001390846; NP_001390847 NP_001390848; NP_001390849; NP_001390850
Location (UCSC)	Chr 16: 47.46 – 47.7 Mb	Chr 8: 86.57 – 86.79 Mb
PubMed search
- Wikidata
View/Edit Human	View/Edit Mouse

Phosphorylase b kinase regulatory subunit beta is an enzyme that in humans is encoded by the PHKB gene.
