= PHKG2 =

Protein-coding gene in the species Homo sapiens

Available structures
PDB	Ortholog search: PDBe RCSB
PDB	List of PDB id codes 2Y7J

Identifiers
- Aliases: PHKG2, GSD9C, phosphorylase kinase catalytic subunit gamma 2
- External IDs: OMIM: 172471; MGI: 1916211; HomoloGene: 47915; GeneCards: PHKG2; OMA:PHKG2 - orthologs

Gene location (Human)
Chr.	Chromosome 16 (human)
Band	16p11.2	Start	30,748,293 bp
Band	16p11.2	End	30,761,176 bp

Gene location (Mouse)
Chr.	Chromosome 7 (mouse)
Band	7|7 F3	Start	127,172,512 bp
Band	7|7 F3	End	127,182,479 bp
RNA expression pattern
Bgee	Human / Mouse (ortholog); Top expressed in: left testis; right testis; granulocyte; mucosa of transverse colon; right lobe of liver; anterior pituitary; right uterine tube; right lobe of thyroid gland; left lobe of thyroid gland; right hemisphere of cerebellum / Top expressed in: seminiferous tubule; spermatid; spermatocyte; granulocyte; superior frontal gyrus; primary visual cortex; facial motor nucleus; cerebellar cortex; thymus; neural layer of retina; More reference expression data
BioGPS	n/a
Gene ontology
Molecular function	phosphorylase kinase activity; transferase activity; nucleotide binding; protein kinase activity; calmodulin binding; kinase activity; protein serine/threonine kinase activity; tau-protein kinase activity; enzyme binding; ATP binding; protein binding; calmodulin-dependent protein kinase activity
Cellular component	phosphorylase kinase complex; cytosol; cellular component
Biological process	phosphorylation; generation of precursor metabolites and energy; protein phosphorylation; glycogen biosynthetic process; positive regulation of glycogen catabolic process; glycogen metabolic process; peptidyl-serine phosphorylation; peptidyl-threonine phosphorylation; intracellular signal transduction; carbohydrate metabolic process; glycogen catabolic process
Sources:Amigo / QuickGO
Orthologs
Species	Human	Mouse
Entrez	5261	68961
Ensembl	ENSG00000156873	ENSMUSG00000030815
UniProt	P15735	Q9DB30
RefSeq (mRNA)	NM_001172432; NM_000294	NM_026888; NM_001360741
RefSeq (protein)	NP_000285; NP_001165903	NP_081164; NP_001347670
Location (UCSC)	Chr 16: 30.75 – 30.76 Mb	Chr 7: 127.17 – 127.18 Mb
PubMed search
- Wikidata
View/Edit Human	View/Edit Mouse

Phosphorylase b kinase gamma catalytic chain, testis/liver isoform is an enzyme that in humans is encoded by the PHKG2 gene.

The PHKG2 gene provides instructions for making one piece, the gamma subunit, of the phosphorylase b kinase enzyme. This enzyme is made up of 16 subunits, four each of the alpha, beta, gamma, and delta subunits. (Each subunit is produced from a different gene.) The gamma subunit performs the function of phosphorylase b kinase enzyme, and the other subunits help regulate its activity. This enzyme is found in various tissues, although it is most abundant in the liver and muscles. One version of the enzyme is found in liver cells and another in muscle cells. The gamma-2 subunit produced from the PHKG2 gene is part of the enzyme found in the liver.

Phosphorylase b kinase plays an important role in providing energy for cells. The main source of cellular energy is a simple sugar called glucose. Glucose is stored in muscle and liver cells in a form called glycogen. Glycogen can be broken down rapidly when glucose is needed, for instance to maintain normal levels of glucose in the blood between meals. Phosphorylase b kinase turns on (activates) another enzyme called glycogen phosphorylase b by converting it to the more active form, glycogen phosphorylase a. When active, this enzyme breaks down glycogen.
