= HKDC1 =

Protein-coding gene in the species Homo sapiens

Identifiers
- Aliases: HKDC1, hexokinase domain containing 1, RP92
- External IDs: OMIM: 617221; MGI: 2384910; GeneCards: HKDC1
Enzyme activity
EC #	BRENDA	ExPASy	KEGG	MetaCyc
2.7.1.1	↗	↗	↗	↗

Gene location (Human)
Chr.	Chromosome 10 (human)
Band	10q22.1	Start	69,220,332 bp
Band	10q22.1	End	69,267,552 bp

Gene location (Mouse)
Chr.	Chromosome 10 (mouse)
Band	10|10 B4	Start	62,218,916 bp
Band	10|10 B4	End	62,258,270 bp
RNA expression pattern
Bgee	Human / Mouse (ortholog); Top expressed in: jejunal mucosa; duodenum; testicle; mucosa of ileum; mucosa of transverse colon; islet of Langerhans; gallbladder; body of pancreas; right uterine tube; human kidney / Top expressed in: renal calyx; intestinal villus; epithelium of small intestine; jejunum; lateral recess; duodenum; ileum; yolk sac; lateral ventricle; choroid plexus of lateral ventricle; More reference expression data
BioGPS	n/a
Gene ontology
Molecular function	kinase activity; transferase activity; nucleotide binding; fructokinase activity; mannokinase activity; glucokinase activity; hexokinase activity; ATP binding; phosphotransferase activity, alcohol group as acceptor; glucose binding
Cellular component	cytosol; mitochondrion
Biological process	cellular glucose homeostasis; hexose metabolic process; glycolytic process; carbohydrate phosphorylation; phosphorylation; glucose 6-phosphate metabolic process; carbohydrate metabolic process
Sources:Amigo / QuickGO
Orthologs
Databases	NCBI: entry; OMA: entry
Species	Human	Mouse
Entrez	80201	216019
Ensembl	ENSG00000156510	ENSMUSG00000020080
UniProt	Q2TB90	Q91W97
RefSeq (mRNA)	NM_025130	NM_145419
RefSeq (protein)	NP_079406	NP_663394
Location (UCSC)	Chr 10: 69.22 – 69.27 Mb	Chr 10: 62.22 – 62.26 Mb
PubMed search
- Wikidata
View/Edit Human	View/Edit Mouse

Hexokinase domain containing 1 (HKDC1) is an enzyme which in humans is encoded by the HKDC1 gene on chromosome 10. It is a recently discovered hexokinase isoform that likely phosphorylates glucose in maternal metabolism during pregnancy.

== Structure ==
The HKDC1 gene is oriented in a head-to-tail arrangement next to the HK1 gene on chromosome 10. This arrangement, along with its amino acid sequence similarity to HK1, suggests that HKDC1 and HK1 derived from the same precursor via a tandem gene duplication event. The similarity between HKDC1 and HK1 may have obscured its discovery in earlier screens for vertebrate hexokinases. Unlike the HK2 pseudogene, HKDC1 contains an intact open reading frame of 917 residues. It is conserved across animal species, indicating that it encodes a functional protein. Moreover, the encoded protein contains conserved glucose-binding sites in its N- and C-terminal domains as well as an ATP-binding site in its C-terminal domain, indicating that its C-terminal is capable of hexokinase activity.

== Function ==
As the recently identified fifth isoform of hexokinase, HKDC1 catalyzes the rate-limiting and first obligatory step of glucose metabolism, which is the ATP-dependent phosphorylation of glucose to G6P. Though its particular biological function remains unclear, HKDC1 has been suggested to play a more major role in glucose metabolism during pregnancy, as the mother would need to provide enough energy for both herself and the fetus. HKDC1 is ubiquitously expressed, with the highest levels of expression in pharynx, thymus, colon, esophagus, and eye tissue.

== Clinical significance ==
=== Cancer ===
Compared to the other hexokinases, HKDC1 was dramatically overexpressed in cancer tissues, indicating that this isoform might play an important and different role in cancer growth. Further experiments clarifying this role will be required for developing HKDC1 as a therapeutic target.

=== Gestational hyperglycemia ===
Several regulatory variants, including various enhancers, targeting HKDC1 expression have been associated with gestational hyperglycemia in pregnant women. Considering that maternal glucose levels during pregnancy impact both the fetal and later health outcomes, a greater understanding of the genetic mechanisms underlying maternal glycemia during pregnancy may help identify and aid such women at risk.

== See also ==
- Hexokinase
- HK1
- HK2
- HK3
- Glucokinase
