= Cadisegliatin =

Names
- IUPAC name [(2-{[Cyclohexyl(trans-4-propoxycyclohexyl)carbamoyl]amino}-1,3-thiazol-5-yl)sulfanyl]acetic acid

Identifiers
CAS Number	859525-02-3
3D model (JSmol)	Interactive image
ChEMBL	ChEMBL5095262
ChemSpider	123963152
PubChem CID	54673176
UNII	98S8SH8UNF
- InChI: InChI=1S/C21H33N3O4S2/c1-2-12-28-17-10-8-16(9-11-17)24(15-6-4-3-5-7-15)21(27)23-20-22-13-19(30-20)29-14-18(25)26/h13,15-17H,2-12,14H2,1H3,(H,25,26)(H,22,23,27)/t16-,17- Key: HPGJSAAUJGAMLV-QAQDUYKDSA-N
- SMILES: CCCO[C@H]1CC[C@H](N(C(NC2=NC=C(SCC(O)=O)S2)=O)C3CCCCC3)CC1

Properties
Chemical formula	C_{21}H_{33}N_{3}O_{4}S_{2}
Molar mass	455.63 g·mol^{−1}
- Except where otherwise noted, data are given for materials in their standard state (at 25 °C [77 °F], 100 kPa). Infobox references

Cadisegliatin (TTP399) is a liver-selective glucokinase activator. It is being developed by VTV Therapeutics for treatment of type 2 diabetes or type 1 diabetes as an adjunct to insulin.
