= Hexokinase =

Class of enzymes

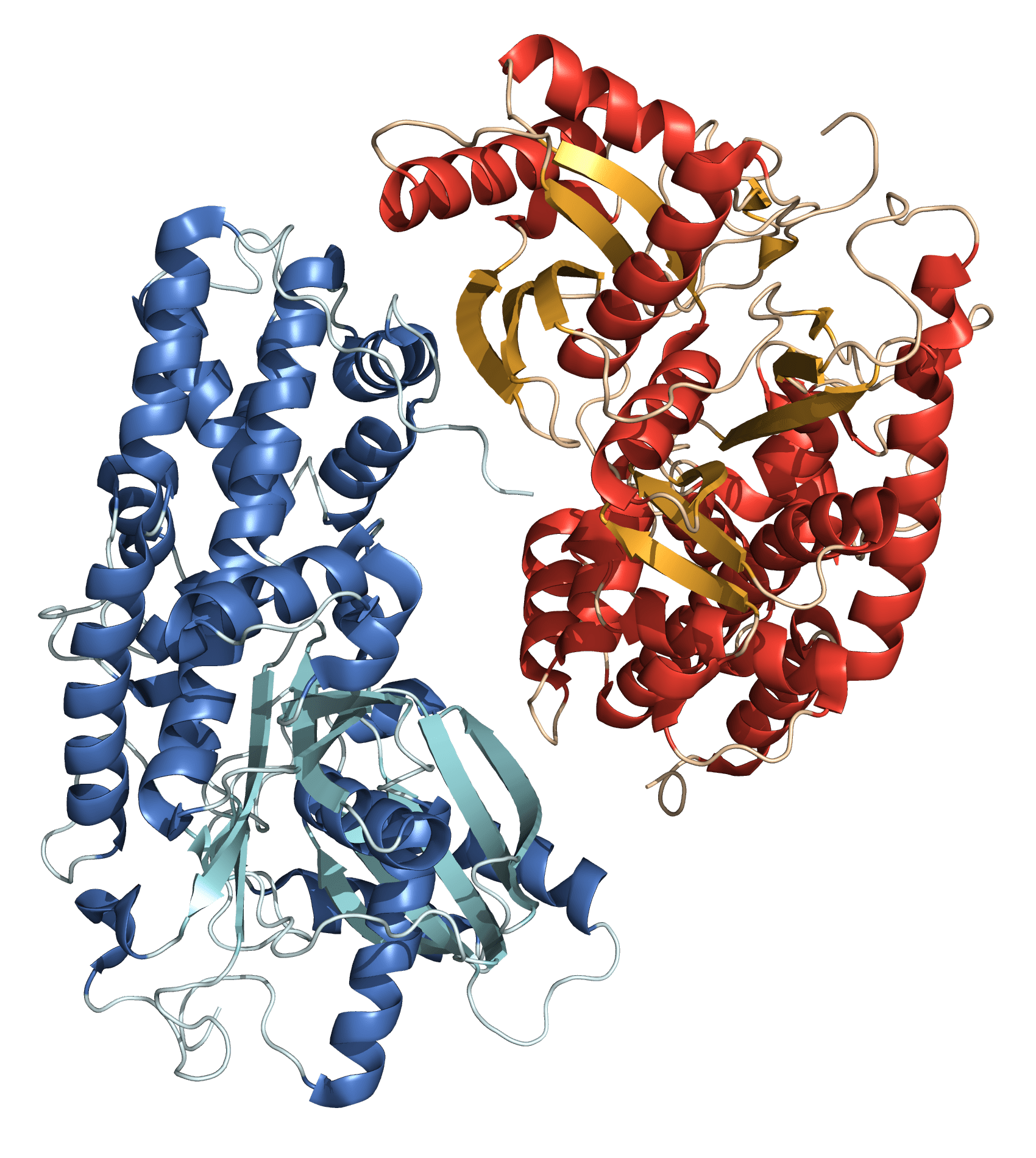
- Crystal structures of hexokinase 1 from Kluyveromyces lactis.

Identifiers
- EC no.: 2.7.1.1
- CAS no.: 9001-51-8

Databases
- BRENDA: enzyme data
- ExPASy: NiceZyme view
- KEGG: enzyme entry
- MetaCyc: metabolic pathway
- Rhea: reactions
- PDB structures: RCSB PDB PDBe PDBsum
- Gene Ontology: AmiGO / QuickGO
Search
- PMC: articles
- PubMed: articles
- NCBI: proteins

hexokinase 1
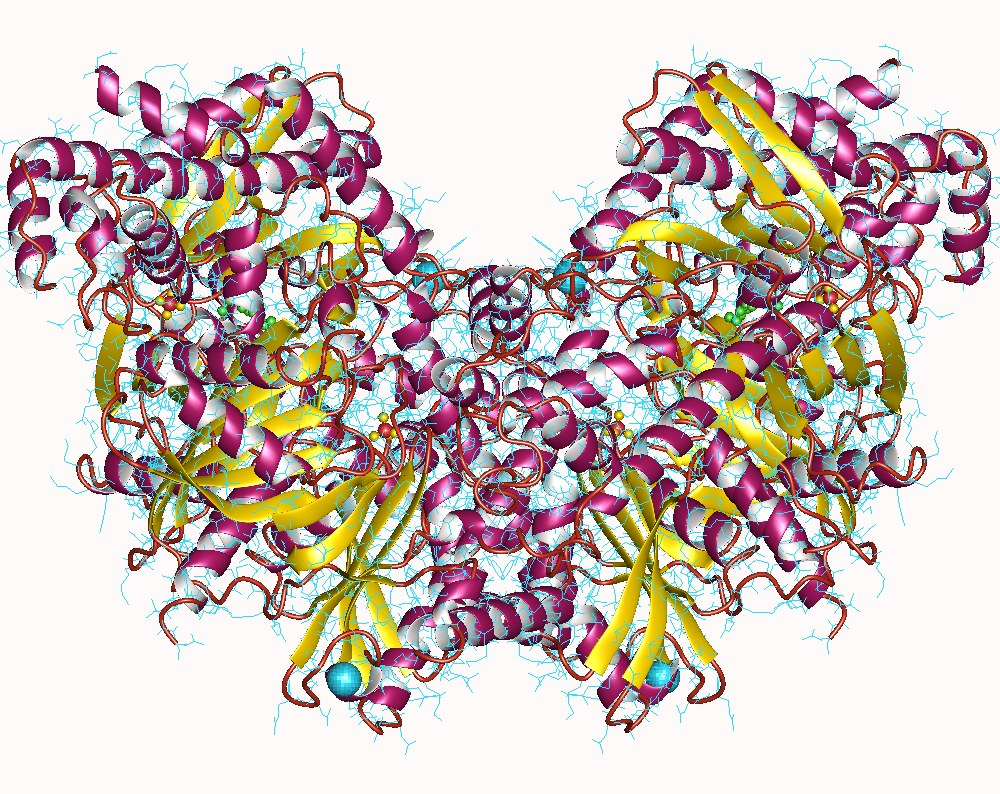
- Hexokinase 1, homodimer, Human

Identifiers
- Symbol: HK1
- NCBI gene: 3098
- HGNC: 4922
- OMIM: 142600
- RefSeq: NM_000188
- UniProt: P19367

Other data
- Locus: Chr. 10 q22
Search for
- Structures: Swiss-model
- Domains: InterPro

hexokinase 2

Identifiers
- Symbol: HK2
- NCBI gene: 3099
- HGNC: 4923
- OMIM: 601125
- RefSeq: NM_000189
- UniProt: P52789

Other data
- Locus: Chr. 2 p13
Search for
- Structures: Swiss-model
- Domains: InterPro

hexokinase 3 (white cell)

Identifiers
- Symbol: HK3
- NCBI gene: 3101
- HGNC: 4925
- OMIM: 142570
- RefSeq: NM_002115
- UniProt: P52790

Other data
- Locus: Chr. 5 q35.2
Search for
- Structures: Swiss-model
- Domains: InterPro

Hexokinase_1
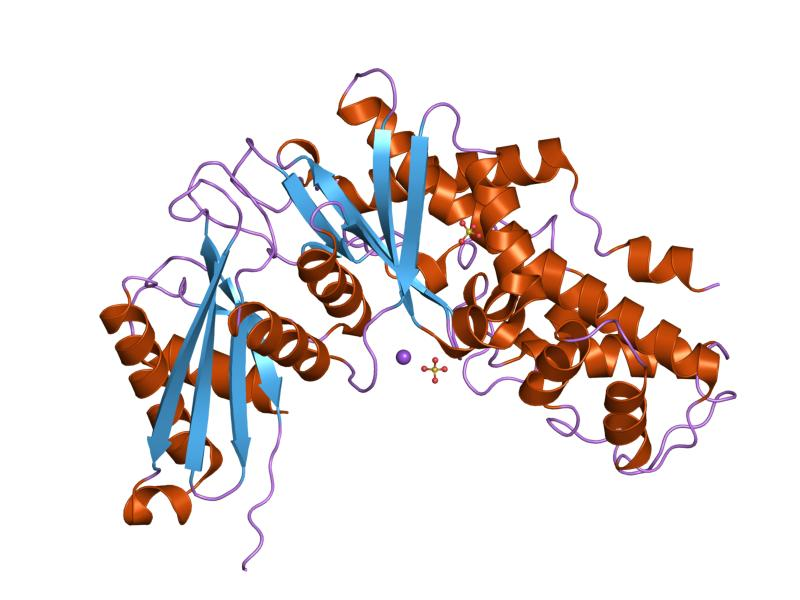
- crystal structure of human glucokinase

Identifiers
- Symbol: Hexokinase_1
- Pfam: PF00349
- Pfam clan: CL0108
- InterPro: IPR022672
- PROSITE: PDOC00370
- SCOP2: 1cza / SCOPe / SUPFAM
Available protein structures:
- PDB: IPR022672 PF00349 (ECOD; PDBsum)
- AlphaFold: IPR022672; PF00349

Hexokinase_2
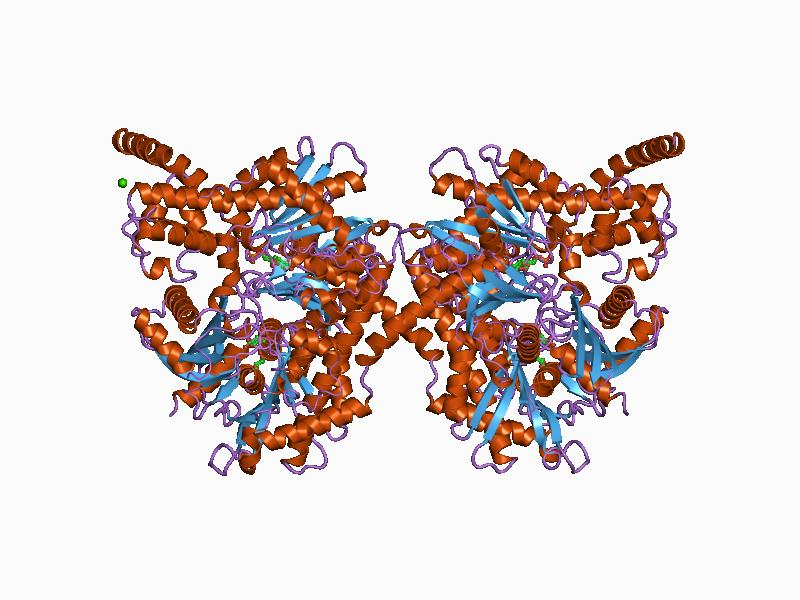
- rat brain hexokinase type i complex with glucose and inhibitor glucose-6-phosphate

Identifiers
- Symbol: Hexokinase_2
- Pfam: PF03727
- Pfam clan: CL0108
- InterPro: IPR022673
- PROSITE: PDOC00370
- SCOP2: 1cza / SCOPe / SUPFAM
Available protein structures:
- PDB: IPR022673 PF03727 (ECOD; PDBsum)
- AlphaFold: IPR022673; PF03727

A hexokinase is an enzyme that irreversibly phosphorylates hexoses (six-carbon sugars), forming hexose phosphate. In most organisms, glucose is the most important substrate for hexokinases, and glucose-6-phosphate is the most important product. Hexokinase possesses the ability to transfer an inorganic phosphate group from ATP to a substrate.

Hexokinases should not be confused with glucokinase, which is a specific hexokinase found in the liver. All hexokinases are capable of phosphorylating several hexoses but hexokinase IV(D) is often misleadingly called glucokinase, though it is no more specific for glucose than the other mammalian isoenzymes.

== Species distraction ==
Genes that encode hexokinase have been discovered in every domain of life, and exist among a variety of species that range from bacteria, yeast, and plants to humans and other vertebrates. The enzymes from yeast, plants and vertebrates all show clear sequence evidence of homology, but those of bacteria may not be related.

== Structure ==
They are categorized as actin fold proteins, sharing a common ATP binding site core that is surrounded by more variable sequences which determine substrate affinities and other properties.

== Size of different isoforms ==
Most bacterial hexokinases are approximately 50 kDa in size. Multicellular organisms including plants and animals often have more than one hexokinase isoform. Most are about 100 kDa in size and consist of two halves (N and C terminal), which share much sequence homology. This suggests an evolutionary origin by duplication and fusion of a 50 kDa ancestral hexokinase similar to those of bacteria.

== Types ==
There are four important mammalian hexokinase isozymes (EC 2.7.1.1) that vary in subcellular locations and kinetics with respect to different substrates and conditions, and physiological function. They were designated hexokinases A, B, C, and D on the basis of their electrophoretic mobility. The alternative names hexokinases I, II, III, and IV (respectively) proposed later are widely used.

=== Hexokinases I, II, and III ===
Hexokinases I, II, and III are referred to as low-K_{m} isoenzymes because of a high affinity for glucose (below 1 mM). Hexokinases I and II follow Michaelis-Menten kinetics at physiological concentrations of substrates. All three are strongly inhibited by their product, glucose-6-phosphate. Molecular masses are around 100 kDa. Each consists of two similar 50kDa halves, but only in hexokinase II do both halves have functional active sites.

- Hexokinase I/A is found in all mammalian tissues, and is considered a "housekeeping enzyme," unaffected by most physiological, hormonal, and metabolic changes.
- Hexokinase II/B constitutes the principal regulated isoenzyme in many cell types and is increased in many cancers. It is the hexokinase found in muscle and heart. Hexokinase II is also located at the mitochondria outer membrane so it can have direct access to ATP. The relative specific activity of hexokinase II increases with pH at least in a pH range from 6.9 to 8.5.
- Hexokinase III/C is substrate-inhibited by glucose at physiological concentrations. Little is known about the regulatory characteristics of this isoenzyme.

=== Hexokinase IV ("glucokinase") ===
Mammalian hexokinase IV, also referred to as glucokinase, differs from other hexokinases in kinetics and functions.

The location of glucokinase within the liver cells changes between the cytoplasm and nucleus depending on the amount of available glucose. When glucose levels are high, glucokinase participates in the phosphorylatation of glucose in the cytoplasm. However, when glucose levels drop, glucokinase regulatory protein binds to glucokinase and moves it to the nucleus where it is inactive. It does not follow Henri–Michaelis–Menten kinetics, and has no K_{m}. It is half-saturated at glucose concentrations 100 times higher than those of hexokinases I, II, and III.

Hexokinase IV is monomeric, about 50kDa, displays positive cooperativity with glucose, and is not allosterically inhibited by its product, glucose-6-phosphate.

Hexokinase IV is present in the liver, pancreas, hypothalamus, small intestine, and perhaps certain other neuroendocrine cells, and plays an important regulatory role in carbohydrate metabolism. In the β cells of the pancreatic islets, it serves as a glucose sensor to control insulin release, and similarly controls glucagon release in the α cells. In hepatocytes of the liver, glucokinase responds to changes of ambient glucose levels by increasing or reducing glycogen synthesis.

== Reaction ==
The intracellular reactions mediated by hexokinases can be typified as:

Hexose-CH_{2}OH + MgATP^{2−} → Hexose-CH_{2}O-PO^{2−}_{3} + MgADP^{−} + H^{+}

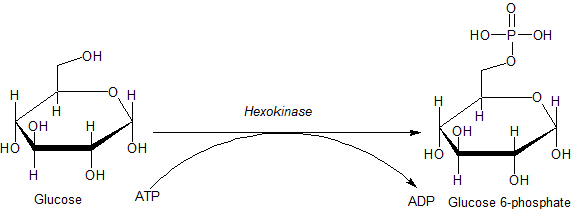
where hexose-CH_{2}OH represents any of several hexoses (like glucose) that contain an accessible -CH_{2}OH moiety.

== Function ==
Phosphorylation of a hexose such as glucose often limits it to a number of intracellular metabolic processes, such as glycolysis or glycogen synthesis. This is because phosphorylated hexoses are charged, and thus more difficult to transport out of a cell.

In patients with essential fructosuria, metabolism of fructose by hexokinase to fructose-6-phosphate is the primary method of metabolizing dietary fructose; this pathway is not significant in normal individuals.

Glucose is unique in that it can be used to produce ATP by all cells in both the presence and absence of molecular oxygen (O_{2}). The first step in glycolysis is the phosphorylation of glucose by hexokinase.

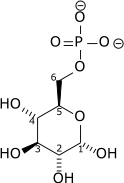
D-Glucose	Hexokinase		α-D-Glucose-6-phosphate
	ATP	ADP

Compound C00031 at KEGG Pathway Database. Enzyme 2.7.1.1 at KEGG Pathway Database. Compound C00668 at KEGG Pathway Database. Reaction R01786 at KEGG Pathway Database.

By catalyzing the phosphorylation of glucose to yield glucose 6-phosphate, hexokinases maintain the downhill concentration gradient that favors the facilitated transport of glucose into cells. This reaction also initiates all physiologically relevant pathways of glucose utilization, including glycolysis and the pentose phosphate pathway. The addition of a charged phosphate group at the 6-position of hexoses also ensures 'trapping' of glucose and 2-deoxyhexose glucose analogs (e.g. 2-deoxyglucose, and 2-fluoro-2-deoxyglucose) within cells, as charged hexose phosphates cannot easily cross the cell membrane.

== Clinical significance ==
=== Cancer ===
Hexokinases I and II can associate physically to the outer surface of the external membrane of mitochondria through specific binding to a porin, or voltage dependent anion channel. This association confers hexokinase direct access to ATP generated by mitochondria, which is one of the two substrates of hexokinase. Mitochondrial hexokinase is highly elevated in rapidly growing malignant tumor cells, with levels up to 200 times higher than normal tissues. Mitochondrially bound hexokinase has been demonstrated to be the driving force for the extremely high glycolytic rates that take place aerobically in tumor cells (the so-called Warburg effect described by Otto Heinrich Warburg in 1930).

=== Deficiency ===
Hexokinase deficiency is a genetic autosomal recessive disease that causes chronic haemolytic anaemia. Chronic haemolytic anaemia is caused by a mutation in the gene that codes for hexokinase. The mutation causes a reduction of the hexokinase activity, and hence hexokinase deficiency.

== See also ==
- Allostery – Regulation of enzyme activity
- Enzyme catalysis – Catalysis of chemical reactions by enzymes
- Flexible linker – Study of how proteins move and change shape
- Fluorescent glucose biosensors – Blood glucose measurement device
- Glucokinase – Enzyme participating to the regulation of carbohydrate metabolism
- Glycolysis – Series of interconnected biochemical reactions
- Glycogen – Glucose polymer used as energy store in animals
- Glucose 6-phosphatase – Enzyme
- Hexose phosphate uptake
- Insulin – Peptide hormone
- Protein domain dynamics – Study of how proteins move and change shape
- Protein flexibility – Self-stable region of a protein's chain that folds independently from the rest
