= Globalagliatin =

Chemical compound

Clinical data
- Other names: SY-004

Legal status
- Legal status: Investigational

Identifiers
- IUPAC name: (1R,2S)-2-Cyclohexyl-1-(4-cyclopropylsulfonylphenyl)-N-[5-(2-pyrrolidin-1-ylethylsulfanyl)-1,3-thiazol-2-yl]cyclopropane-1-carboxamide
- CAS Number: 1234703-40-2
- PubChem CID: 46832368
- DrugBank: DB12284
- ChemSpider: 26323625
- UNII: 5A0L003HEY
- ChEMBL: ChEMBL4297399

Chemical and physical data
- Formula: C_{28}H_{37}N_{3}O_{3}S_{3}
- Molar mass: 559.80 g·mol^{−1}
- 3D model (JSmol): Interactive image
- SMILES: C1CCC(CC1)[C@@H]2C[C@@]2(C3=CC=C(C=C3)S(=O)(=O)C4CC4)C(=O)NC5=NC=C(S5)SCCN6CCCC6
- InChI: InChI=1S/C28H37N3O3S3/c32-26(30-27-29-19-25(36-27)35-17-16-31-14-4-5-15-31)28(18-24(28)20-6-2-1-3-7-20)21-8-10-22(11-9-21)37(33,34)23-12-13-23/h8-11,19-20,23-24H,1-7,12-18H2,(H,29,30,32)/t24-,28-/m0/s1; Key:QIIVJLHCZUTGSD-CUBQBAPOSA-N

Globalagliatin (SY-004) is a glucokinase activator developed by Yabao Pharmaceutical Group for type 2 diabetes.
