= Hexokinase I =

Mammalian protein found in Homo sapiens

HK1
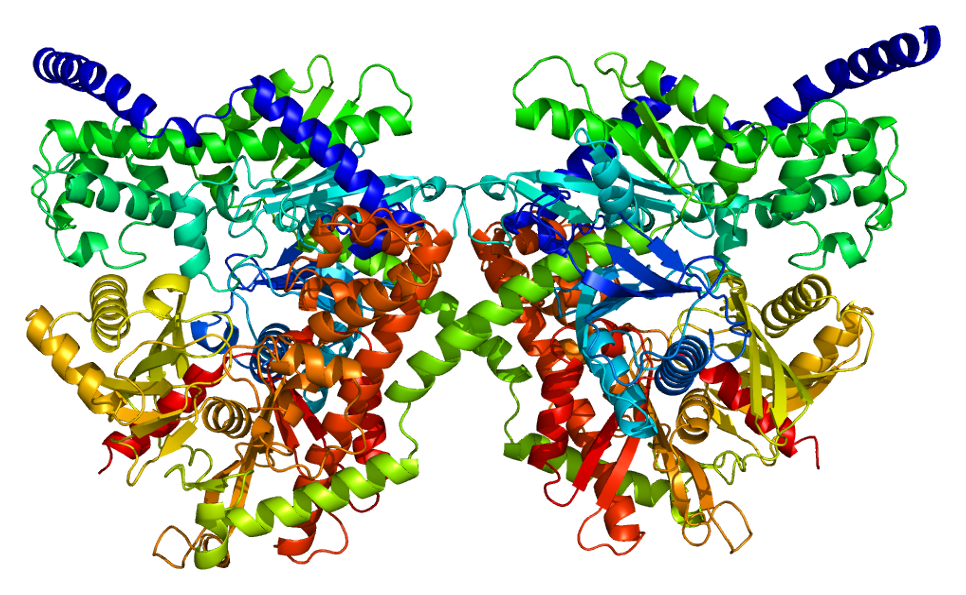

Identifiers
- Aliases: HK1, HK1-ta, HK1-tb, HK1-tc, HKD, HKI, HMSNR, HXK1, hexokinase 1, HK, hexokinase, RP79, NEDVIBA
- External IDs: OMIM: 142600; MGI: 96103; GeneCards: HK1
Available structures
PDB	Ortholog search: PDBe RCSB
PDB	List of PDB id codes 1CZA, 1DGK, 1HKB, 1HKC, 1QHA, 4F9O, 4FOE, 4FOI, 4FPA, 4FPB
Enzyme activity
EC #	BRENDA	ExPASy	KEGG	MetaCyc
2.7.1.1	↗	↗	↗	↗

Gene location (Human)
Chr.	Chromosome 10 (human)
Band	10q22.1	Start	69,269,984 bp
Band	10q22.1	End	69,401,884 bp

Gene location (Mouse)
Chr.	Chromosome 10 (mouse)
Band	10 B4|10 32.37 cM	Start	62,104,634 bp
Band	10 B4|10 32.37 cM	End	62,215,687 bp
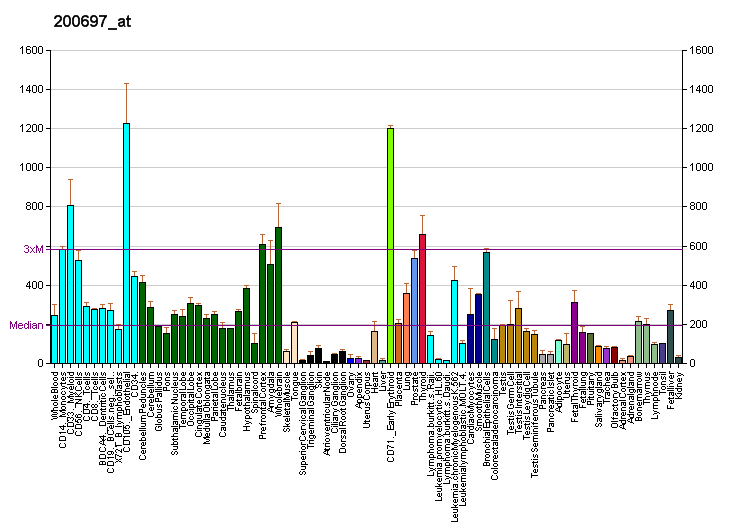
RNA expression pattern
Bgee	Human / Mouse (ortholog); Top expressed in: cerebellar vermis; mucosa of pharynx; pons; cardiac muscle tissue of right atrium; body of tongue; spinal ganglia; parotid gland; sperm; myocardium of left ventricle; superior vestibular nucleus / Top expressed in: neural layer of retina; seminiferous tubule; spermatid; subiculum; piriform cortex; retinal pigment epithelium; dorsal tegmental nucleus; central gray substance of midbrain; dorsomedial hypothalamic nucleus; superior colliculus; More reference expression data
BioGPS	More reference expression data
Gene ontology
Molecular function	transferase activity; nucleotide binding; mannokinase activity; phosphotransferase activity, alcohol group as acceptor; kinase activity; glucose binding; catalytic activity; protein binding; fructokinase activity; ATP binding; glucokinase activity; hexokinase activity; peptidoglycan binding; identical protein binding
Cellular component	cytosol; membrane; cilium; mitochondrial outer membrane; sperm principal piece; mitochondrion; membrane raft
Biological process	glycolytic process; phosphorylation; canonical glycolysis; cellular glucose homeostasis; maintenance of protein location in mitochondrion; establishment of protein localization to mitochondrion; hexose metabolic process; metabolism; glucose 6-phosphate metabolic process; carbohydrate metabolic process; carbohydrate phosphorylation
Sources:Amigo / QuickGO
Orthologs
Databases	NCBI: entry; OMA: entry
Species	Human	Mouse
Entrez	3098	15275
Ensembl	ENSG00000156515	ENSMUSG00000037012
UniProt	P19367	P17710
RefSeq (mRNA)	NM_000188; NM_033496; NM_033497; NM_033498; NM_033500 NM_001322364; NM_001322365; NM_001322366; NM_001322367; NM_001358263	NM_001146100; NM_010438
RefSeq (protein)	NP_000179; NP_001309293; NP_001309294; NP_001309295; NP_001309296 NP_277031; NP_277032; NP_277033; NP_277035; NP_001345192	NP_001139572; NP_034568
Location (UCSC)	Chr 10: 69.27 – 69.4 Mb	Chr 10: 62.1 – 62.22 Mb
PubMed search
- Wikidata
View/Edit Human	View/Edit Mouse

Hexokinase I, also known as hexokinase A and HK1, is an enzyme that in humans is encoded by the HK1 gene on chromosome 10. Hexokinases phosphorylate glucose to produce glucose-6-phosphate (G6P), the first step in most glucose metabolism pathways. This gene encodes a ubiquitous form of hexokinase which localizes to the outer membrane of mitochondria. Mutations in this gene have been associated with hemolytic anemia due to hexokinase deficiency. Alternative splicing of this gene results in five transcript variants which encode different isoforms, some of which are tissue-specific. Each isoform has a distinct N-terminus; the remainder of the protein is identical among all the isoforms. A sixth transcript variant has been described, but due to the presence of several stop codons, it is not thought to encode a protein. [provided by RefSeq, Apr 2009]

== Structure ==
Hexokinase I is one of four highly homologous hexokinase isoforms in mammalian cells.

=== Gene ===
The HK1 gene spans approximately 131 kb and consists of 25 exons. Alternative splicing of its 5' exons produces different transcripts in different cell types: exons 1-5 and exon 8 (exons T1-6) are testis-specific exons; exon 6, located approximately 15 kb downstream of the testis-specific exons, is the erythroid-specific exon (exon R); and exon 7, located approximately 2.85 kb downstream of exon R, is the first 5' exon for the ubiquitously expressed hexokinase I isoform. Moreover, exon 7 encodes the porin-binding domain (PBD) conserved in mammalian HK1 genes. Meanwhile, the remaining 17 exons are shared among all hexokinase I isoforms.

In addition to exon R, a stretch of the proximal promoter that contains a GATA element, an SP1 site, CCAAT, and an Ets-binding motif is necessary for expression of HK-R in erythroid cells.

=== Protein ===
This gene encodes a 100 kDa homodimer with a regulatory N-terminal domain (1-475), catalytic C-terminal domain (residues 476-917), and an α-helix connecting its two subunits. Both terminal domains are composed of a large subdomain and a small subdomain. The flexible region of the C-terminal large subdomain (residues 766–810) can adopt various positions and is proposed to interact with the base of ATP. Moreover, glucose and G6P bind in close proximity at the N- and C-terminal domains and stabilize a common conformational state of the C-terminal domain. According to one model, G6P acts as an allosteric inhibitor which binds the N-terminal domain to stabilize its closed conformation, which then stabilizes a conformation of the C-terminal flexible subdomain that blocks ATP. A second model posits that G6P acts as an active inhibitor that stabilizes the closed conformation and competes with ATP for the C-terminal binding site. Results from several studies suggest that the C-terminal is capable of both catalytic and regulatory action. Meanwhile, the hydrophobic N-terminal lacks enzymatic activity by itself but contains the G6P regulatory site and the PBD, which is responsible for the protein's stability and binding to the outer mitochondrial membrane (OMM).

== Function ==
As one of two mitochondrial isoforms of hexokinase and a member of the sugar kinase family, hexokinase I catalyzes the rate-limiting and first obligatory step of glucose metabolism, which is the ATP-dependent phosphorylation of glucose to G6P. Physiological levels of G6P can regulate this process by inhibiting hexokinase I as negative feedback, though inorganic phosphate (P_{i}) can relieve G6P inhibition. However, unlike HK2 and HK3, hexokinase I itself is not directly regulated by P_{i}, which better suits its ubiquitous catabolic role. By phosphorylating glucose, hexokinase I effectively prevents glucose from leaving the cell and, thus, commits glucose to energy metabolism. Moreover, its localization and attachment to the OMM promotes the coupling of glycolysis to mitochondrial oxidative phosphorylation, which greatly enhances ATP production by direct recycling of mitochondrial ATP/ADP to meet the cell's energy demands. Specifically, OMM-bound hexokinase I binds VDAC1 to trigger opening of the mitochondrial permeability transition pore and release mitochondrial ATP to further fuel the glycolytic process.

Another critical function for OMM-bound hexokinase I is cell survival and protection against oxidative damage. Activation of Akt kinase is mediated by hexokinase I-VDAC1 coupling as part of the growth factor-mediated phosphatidyl inositol 3-kinase (PI3)/Akt cell survival intracellular signaling pathway, thus preventing cytochrome c release and subsequent apoptosis. In fact, there is evidence that VDAC binding by the anti-apoptotic hexokinase I and by the pro-apoptotic creatine kinase are mutually exclusive, indicating that the absence of hexokinase I allows creatine kinase to bind and open VDAC. Furthermore, hexokinase I has demonstrated anti-apoptotic activity by antagonizing Bcl-2 proteins located at the OMM, which then inhibits TNF-induced apoptosis.

In the prefrontal cortex, hexokinase I putatively forms a protein complex with EAAT2, Na+/K+ ATPase, and aconitase, which functions to remove glutamate from the perisynaptic space and maintain low basal levels in the synaptic cleft.

=== Tissue expression ===
In particular, hexokinase I is the most ubiquitously expressed isoform out of the four hexokinases, and constitutively expressed in most tissues, though it is majorly found in brain, kidney, and red blood cells (RBCs). Its high abundance in the retina, specifically the photoreceptor inner segment, outer plexiform layer, inner nuclear layer, inner plexiform layer, and ganglion cell layer, attests to its crucial metabolic purpose. It is also expressed in cells derived from hematopoietic stem cells, such as RBCs, leukocytes, and platelets, as well as from erythroid-progenitor cells. Of note, hexokinase I is the sole hexokinase isoform found in the cells and tissues which rely most heavily on glucose metabolism for their function, including brain, erythrocytes, platelets, leukocytes, and fibroblasts. In rats, it is also the predominant hexokinase in fetal tissues, likely due to their constitutive glucose utilization.

== Clinical significance ==
Mutations in this gene are associated with type 4H of Charcot–Marie–Tooth disease, also known as Russe-type hereditary motor and sensory neuropathy (HMSNR). Changes in hexokinase I have also been identified to cause both mild and severe forms of congenital hyperinsulinism. Due to the crucial role of hexokinase I in glycolysis, hexokinase deficiency has been identified as a cause of erythroenzymopathies associated with hereditary non-spherocytic hemolytic anemia (HNSHA). Likewise, hexokinase I deficiency has resulted in cerebral white matter injury, malformations, and psychomotor retardation, as well as latent diabetes mellitus and panmyelopathy. Meanwhile, hexokinase I is highly expressed in cancers, and its anti-apoptotic effects have been observed in highly glycolytic hepatoma cells.

=== Neurodegenerative disorders ===
Hexokinase I may be causally linked to mood and psychotic disorders, including unipolar depression (UPD), bipolar disorder (BPD), and schizophrenia via both its roles in energy metabolism and cell survival. For instance, the accumulation of lactate in the brains of BPD and SCHZ patients potentially results from the decoupling of hexokinase I from the OMM, and by extension, glycolysis from mitochondrial oxidative, phosphorylation. In the case of SCHZ, decreasing hexokinase I attachment to the OMM in the parietal cortex resulted in decreased glutamate reuptake capacity and, thus, glutamate spillover from the synapses. The released glutamate activates extrasynaptic glutamate receptors, leading to altered structure and function of glutamate circuits, synaptic plasticity, frontal cortical dysfunction, and ultimately, the cognitive deficits characteristic of SCHZ. Similarly, hexokinase I mitochondrial detachment has been associated with hypothyroidism, which involves abnormal brain development and increased risk for depression, while its attachment leads to neural growth. In Parkinson's disease, hexokinase I detachment from VDAC via Parkin-mediated ubiquitylation and degradation disrupts the MPTP on depolarized mitochondria, consequently blocking mitochondrial localization of Parkin and halting glycolysis. Further research is required to determine the relative hexokinase I detachment needed in various cell types for different psychiatric disorders. This research can also contribute to developing therapies to target causes of the detachment, from gene mutations to interference by factors such as beta-amyloid peptide and insulin.

=== Retinitis pigmentosa ===
A heterozygous missense mutation in the HK1 gene (a change at position 847 from glutamate to lysine) has been linked to retinitis pigmentosa. Since this substitution mutation is located far from known functional sites and does not impair the enzyme's glycolytic activity, it is likely that the mutation acts through another biological mechanism unique to the retina. Notably, studies in mouse retina reveal interactions between hexokinase I, the mitochondrial metallochaperone Cox11, and the chaperone protein Ranbp2, which serve to maintain normal metabolism and function in the retina. Thus, the mutation may disrupt these interactions and lead to retinal degradation. Alternatively, this mutation may act through the enzyme's anti-apoptotic function, as disrupting the regulation of the hexokinase-mitochondria association by insulin receptors could trigger photoreceptor apoptosis and retinal degeneration. In this case, treatments that preserve the hexokinase–mitochondria association may serve as a potential therapeutic approach.

== Interactions ==
Hexokinase I is known to interact with:

- VDAC,
- Parkin,
- EAAT2,
- Na+/K+ ATPase, and
- Aconitase.

== Interactive pathway map ==
Click on genes, proteins and metabolites below to link to respective articles. (Note: The interactive pathway map can be edited at WikiPathways: "GlycolysisGluconeogenesis_WP534".)

Glycolysis and Gluconeogenesis edit

== See also ==
- Hexokinase
- Hexokinase II
- Hexokinase III
- Glucokinase
