= Hexokinase deficiency =

- Other names: HK deficiency, Non-spherocytic hemolytic anemia due to hexokinase deficiency, NSHA due to HK1 deficiency, and Hexokinase deficiency hemolytic anemia.
- Hexokinase deficiency is an autosomal recessive disorder.
- Specialty: Hematology

Hexokinase deficiency is an extremely rare autosomal recessive condition that falls under the category of erythroenzymopathies, or defects in red cell enzymes. Hexokinase deficiency manifests is associated with chronic nonspherocytic hemolytic anemia. Hemolytic anemia seems to be the only clinical sign of hexokinase deficiency. In 1967 the first case of hexokinase deficiency was described by Valentine et al, since then, less than 50 cases have been reported.

== Signs and symptoms ==
The main clinical feature of affected individuals is mild to severe hemolytic anemia that lasts a lifetime. However, there have also been rare reports of multiple malformations, including psychomotor retardation. Intrauterine fetal death results from a total loss of HK1 expression.

Hemolytic anemias' systemic symptoms, which include weakness, pallor, exhaustion, and dizziness, are similar to those of other anemias. There may be splenic icterus, jaundice, and/or splenomegaly.

Extremely impacted people may develop neonatal hyperbilirubinemia and subsequently need transfusions on a regular basis to treat their uncontrollable anemia. Anemia is absent and hemolysis is completely compensated for, for those with mild disease. Nonetheless, these patients typically have reticulocytosis, splenomegaly, and jaundice. Gallstones can be seen as early as childhood.

== Treatment ==
Treatment includes red cell transfusions as needed, supplemental folic acid, and close monitoring for cholelithiasis. Splenectomy may alleviate anemia but does not cure it.

== See also ==
- Hexokinase
- Hemolytic anemia
