= Hexokinase III =

Mammalian protein found in Homo sapiens

HK3

Identifiers
- Aliases: HK3, HKIII, HXK3, hexokinase 3
- External IDs: OMIM: 142570; MGI: 2670962; GeneCards: HK3
Available structures
PDB	Ortholog search: PDBe RCSB
PDB	List of PDB id codes 3HM8
Enzyme activity
EC #	BRENDA	ExPASy	KEGG	MetaCyc
2.7.1.1	↗	↗	↗	↗

Gene location (Human)
Chr.	Chromosome 5 (human)
Band	5q35.2	Start	176,880,869 bp
Band	5q35.2	End	176,899,346 bp

Gene location (Mouse)
Chr.	Chromosome 13 (mouse)
Band	13|13 B1	Start	55,153,798 bp
Band	13|13 B1	End	55,169,198 bp
RNA expression pattern
Bgee	Human / Mouse (ortholog); Top expressed in: monocyte; granulocyte; spleen; bone marrow cell; blood; upper lobe of left lung; trabecular bone; right lung; right adrenal cortex; appendix / Top expressed in: granulocyte; bone marrow; stroma of bone marrow; mesenteric lymph nodes; calvaria; blood; embryo; spleen; liver; cartilage tissue; More reference expression data
BioGPS	n/a
Gene ontology
Molecular function	transferase activity; nucleotide binding; mannokinase activity; hexokinase activity; phosphotransferase activity, alcohol group as acceptor; glucose binding; kinase activity; catalytic activity; fructokinase activity; ATP binding; glucokinase activity
Cellular component	cytosol; extracellular region; secretory granule lumen; ficolin-1-rich granule lumen
Biological process	glycolytic process; phosphorylation; canonical glycolysis; cellular glucose homeostasis; carbohydrate phosphorylation; hexose metabolic process; metabolism; glucose 6-phosphate metabolic process; neutrophil degranulation; carbohydrate metabolic process
Sources:Amigo / QuickGO
Orthologs
Databases	NCBI: entry; OMA: entry
Species	Human	Mouse
Entrez	3101	212032
Ensembl	ENSG00000160883	ENSMUSG00000025877
UniProt	P52790	Q3TRM8
RefSeq (mRNA)	NM_002115	NM_001033245; NM_001206390; NM_001206391; NM_001206392
RefSeq (protein)	NP_002106	NP_001028417; NP_001193319; NP_001193320; NP_001193321
Location (UCSC)	Chr 5: 176.88 – 176.9 Mb	Chr 13: 55.15 – 55.17 Mb
PubMed search
- Wikidata
View/Edit Human	View/Edit Mouse

Hexokinase III, also known as hexokinase C, is an enzyme which in humans is encoded by the Hk3 gene on chromosome 5. Hexokinases phosphorylate glucose to produce glucose-6-phosphate, the first step in most glucose metabolism pathways. Similar to hexokinases I and II, this allosteric enzyme is inhibited by its product glucose-6-phosphate. [provided by RefSeq, Apr 2009]

== Structure ==
Hexokinase III is one of four homologous hexokinase isoforms in mammalian cells. This protein has a molecular mass of 100 kDa and is composed of two highly similar 50-kDa domains at its N- and C-terminals. This high similarity, along with the existence of a 50-kDa hexokinase (Glucokinase, or hexokinase IV), suggests that the 100-kDa hexokinases originated from a 50-kDa precursor via gene duplication and tandem ligation. As with hexokinase I, only the C-terminal domain possesses catalytic ability, whereas the N-terminal domain is predicted to contain glucose and glucose 6-phosphate binding sites, as well as a 32-residue region essential for proper protein folding. Moreover, the catalytic activity depends on the interaction between the two terminal domains. Unlike hexokinase I and hexokinase II, hexokinase III lacks a mitochondrial binding sequence at its N-terminal.

== Function ==
As a cytoplasmic isoform of hexokinase and a member of the sugar kinase family, hexokinase III catalyzes the rate-limiting and first obligatory step of glucose metabolism, which is the ATP-dependent phosphorylation of glucose to glucose 6-phosphate. Physiological levels of glucose 6-phosphate can regulate this process by inhibiting hexokinase III as negative feedback, though inorganic phosphate can relieve glucose 6-phosphate inhibition. Inorganic phosphate can also directly regulate hexokinase III, and the double regulation may better suit its anabolic functions. By phosphorylating glucose, hexokinase III effectively prevents glucose from leaving the cell and, thus, commits glucose to energy metabolism. Compared to hexokinase I and hexokinase II, hexokinase III possesses a higher affinity for glucose and will bind the substrate even at physiological levels, though this binding may be attenuated by intracellular ATP. Uniquely, hexokinase III can be inhibited by glucose at high concentrations. hexokinase III is also less sensitive to glucose 6-phosphate inhibition.

Despite its lack of mitochondrial association, hexokinase III also functions to protect the cell against apoptosis. Overexpression of hexokinase III has resulted in increased ATP levels, decreased reactive oxygen species (ROS) production, attenuated reduction in the mitochondrial membrane potential, and enhanced mitochondrial biogenesis. Overall, hexokinase III may promote cell survival by controlling ROS levels and boosting energy production. Currently, only hypoxia is known to induce hexokinase III expression through a HIF-dependent pathway. The inducible expression of hexokinase III indicates its adaptive role in metabolic responses to changes in the cellular environment.

In particular, Hk3 is ubiquitously expressed in tissues, albeit at relatively low abundance. Higher abundance levels have been cited in lung, kidney, and liver tissue. Within cells, hexokinase III localizes to the cytoplasm and putatively binds the perinuclear envelope. hexokinase III is the predominant hexokinase in myeloid cells, particularly granulocytes.

== Clinical significance ==
Hexokinase III is found to be overexpressed in malignant follicular thyroid nodules. In conjunction with cyclin A and galectin-3, hexokinase III could be used as diagnostic biomarker to screen for malignancy in patients. Meanwhile, hexokinase III was found to be repressed in acute myeloid leukemia (AML) blast cells and acute promyelocytic leukemia (APL) patients. The transcription factor PU.1 is known to directly activate transcription of the antiapoptotic BCL2A1 gene or inhibit transcription of the p53 tumor suppressor to promote cell survival, and is proposed to also directly activate Hk3 transcription during neutrophil differentiation to support short-term cell survival of mature neutrophils. Regulators repressing hexokinase III expression in AML include PML-RARA and CEBPA. Regarding acute lymphoblastic leukemia (ALL), functional enrichment analysis revealed Hk3 as a key gene and suggests that hexokinase III shares antiapoptotic function with HK1 and HK2.

== Interactions ==
The HK3 promoter is known to interact with PU.1, PML-RARA, and CEBPA.

== Interactive pathway map ==
Click on genes, proteins and metabolites below to link to respective articles. (Note: The interactive pathway map can be edited at WikiPathways: "GlycolysisGluconeogenesis_WP534".)

Glycolysis and Gluconeogenesis edit

== See also ==
- Hexokinase
- Hexokinase I
- Hexokinase II
- Glucokinase (hexokinase IV)
