= Hexokinase II =

Mammalian protein found in humans

HK2
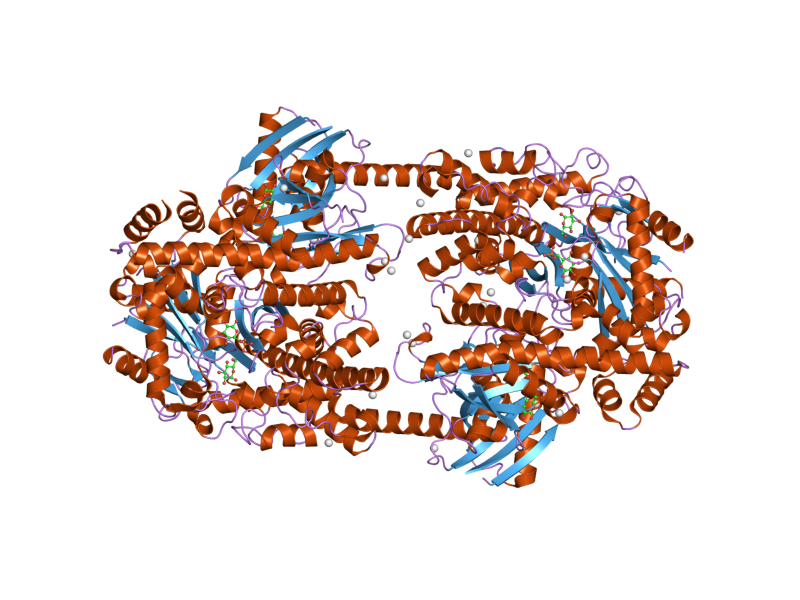

Identifiers
- Aliases: HK2, HKII, HXK2, hexokinase 2
- External IDs: OMIM: 601125; MGI: 1315197; GeneCards: HK2
Available structures
PDB	Ortholog search: PDBe RCSB
PDB	List of PDB id codes 2NZT, 5HFU, 5HG1, 5HEX
Enzyme activity
EC #	BRENDA	ExPASy	KEGG	MetaCyc
2.7.1.1	↗	↗	↗	↗

Gene location (Human)
Chr.	Chromosome 2 (human)
Band	2p12	Start	74,834,127 bp
Band	2p12	End	74,893,359 bp

Gene location (Mouse)
Chr.	Chromosome 6 (mouse)
Band	6 C3|6 35.94 cM	Start	82,702,006 bp
Band	6 C3|6 35.94 cM	End	82,751,435 bp
RNA expression pattern
Bgee	Human / Mouse (ortholog); Top expressed in: corpus epididymis; mucosa of sigmoid colon; body of tongue; cartilage tissue; pericardium; secondary oocyte; Skeletal muscle tissue of biceps brachii; mucosa of transverse colon; rectum; monocyte / Top expressed in: plantaris muscle; extensor digitorum longus muscle; extraocular muscle; neural layer of retina; digastric muscle; masseter muscle; temporal muscle; sternocleidomastoid muscle; tibialis anterior muscle; cardiac muscle tissue of left ventricle; More reference expression data
BioGPS	n/a
Gene ontology
Molecular function	transferase activity; nucleotide binding; mannokinase activity; hexokinase activity; phosphotransferase activity, alcohol group as acceptor; kinase activity; glucose binding; catalytic activity; protein binding; fructokinase activity; ATP binding; glucokinase activity
Cellular component	cytosol; membrane; mitochondrial outer membrane; mitochondrion; plasma membrane; sarcoplasmic reticulum
Biological process	phosphorylation; regulation of glucose import; canonical glycolysis; cellular glucose homeostasis; negative regulation of mitochondrial membrane permeability; carbohydrate phosphorylation; response to ischemia; maintenance of protein location in mitochondrion; establishment of protein localization to mitochondrion; apoptotic mitochondrial changes; negative regulation of reactive oxygen species metabolic process; hexose metabolic process; metabolism; lactation; glycolytic process; positive regulation of autophagy of mitochondrion in response to mitochondrial depolarization; glucose metabolic process; glucose 6-phosphate metabolic process; cellular response to leukemia inhibitory factor; carbohydrate metabolic process; response to hypoxia; positive regulation of angiogenesis
Sources:Amigo / QuickGO
Orthologs
Databases	NCBI: entry; OMA: entry
Species	Human	Mouse
Entrez	3099	15277
Ensembl	ENSG00000159399	ENSMUSG00000000628
UniProt	P52789	O08528
RefSeq (mRNA)	NM_000189; NM_001371525	NM_013820
RefSeq (protein)	NP_000180; NP_001358454	NP_038848
Location (UCSC)	Chr 2: 74.83 – 74.89 Mb	Chr 6: 82.7 – 82.75 Mb
PubMed search
- Wikidata
View/Edit Human	View/Edit Mouse

Hexokinase II, also known as Hexokinase B and HK2, is an enzyme which in humans is encoded by the HK2 gene on chromosome 2. Hexokinases phosphorylate glucose to produce glucose 6-phosphate, the first step in most glucose metabolism pathways. Hexokinase II is the predominant hexokinase form found in skeletal muscle. It localizes to the outer membrane of mitochondria. Expression of the HK2 gene is insulin-responsive, and studies in rat suggest that it is involved in the increased rate of glycolysis seen in rapidly growing cancer cells. [provided by RefSeq, Apr 2009]

== Structure ==
Hexokinase II is one of four homologous hexokinase isoforms in mammalian cells.

=== Gene ===
The HK2 gene spans approximately 50 kb and consists of 18 exons. There is also an HK2 pseudogene integrated into a long interspersed nuclear repetitive DNA element located on the X chromosome. Though its DNA sequence is similar to the cDNA product of the actual HK2 mRNA transcript, it lacks an open reading frame for gene expression.

=== Protein ===
This gene encodes a 100-kDa, 917-residue enzyme with highly similar N-terminal and C-terminal domains that each form half of the protein. This high similarity, along with the existence of a 50-kDa hexokinase (HK4), suggests that the 100-kDa hexokinases originated from a 50-kDa precursor via gene duplication and tandem ligation. Both N- and C-terminal domains possess catalytic ability and can be inhibited by glucose 6-phosphate, though the C-terminal domain demonstrates lower affinity for ATP and is only inhibited at higher concentrations of glucose 6-phosphate. Despite there being two binding sites for glucose, it is proposed that glucose binding at one site induces a conformational change which prevents a second glucose from binding the other site. Meanwhile, the first 12 amino acids of the highly hydrophobic N-terminal serve to bind the enzyme to the mitochondria, while the first 18 amino acids contribute to the enzyme's stability.

== Function ==
As an isoform of hexokinase and a member of the sugar kinase family, hexokinase II catalyzes the rate-limiting and first obligatory step of glucose metabolism, which is the ATP-dependent phosphorylation of glucose to glucose 6-phosphate. Physiological levels of glucose 6-phosphate can regulate this process by inhibiting hexokinase II as negative feedback, though inorganic phosphate (P_{i}) can relieve glucose 6-phosphate inhibition. P_{i} can also directly regulate hexokinase II, and the double regulation may better suit its anabolic functions. By phosphorylating glucose, hexokinase II effectively prevents glucose from leaving the cell and, thus, commits glucose to energy metabolism. Moreover, its localization and attachment to the OMM promotes the coupling of glycolysis to mitochondrial oxidative phosphorylation, which greatly enhances ATP production to meet the cell's energy demands. Specifically, hexokinase II binds VDAC to trigger opening of the channel and release mitochondrial ATP to further fuel the glycolytic process.

Another critical function for OMM-bound hexokinase II is mediation of cell survival. Activation of Akt kinase maintains HK2-VDAC coupling, which subsequently prevents cytochrome c release and apoptosis, though the exact mechanism remains to be confirmed. One model proposes that hexokinase II competes with the pro-apoptotic proteins BAX to bind VDAC, and in the absence of hexokinase II, BAX induces cytochrome c release. In fact, there is evidence that hexokinase II restricts BAX and BAK oligomerization and binding to the OMM. In a similar mechanism, the pro-apoptotic creatine kinase binds and opens VDAC in the absence of hexokinase II. An alternative model proposes the opposite, that hexokinase II regulates binding of the anti-apoptotic protein Bcl-Xl to VDAC.

In particular, hexokinase II is ubiquitously expressed in tissues, though it is majorly found in muscle and adipose tissue. In cardiac and skeletal muscle, hexokinase II can be found bound to both the mitochondrial and sarcoplasmic membrane. HK2 gene expression is regulated by a phosphatidylinositol 3-kinaselp70 S6 protein kinase-dependent pathway and can be induced by factors such as insulin, hypoxia, cold temperatures, and exercise. Its inducible expression indicates its adaptive role in metabolic responses to changes in the cellular environment.

== Clinical significance ==
=== Cancer ===
Hexokinase II is highly expressed in several cancers, including breast cancer and colon cancer. Its role in coupling ATP from oxidative phosphorylation to the rate-limiting step of glycolysis may help drive the tumor cells' growth. Notably, inhibition of hexokinase II has demonstrably improved the effectiveness of anticancer drugs. Thus, hexokinase II stands as a promising therapeutic target, though considering its ubiquitous expression and crucial role in energy metabolism, a reduction rather than complete inhibition of its activity should be pursued.

=== Non-insulin-dependent diabetes mellitus ===
A study on non-insulin-dependent diabetes mellitus (NIDDM) revealed low basal glucose 6-phosphate levels in NIDDM patients that failed to increase with the addition of insulin. One possible cause is decreased phosphorylation of glucose due to a defect in hexokinase II, which was confirmed in further experiments. However, the study could not establish any links between NIDDM and mutations in the HK2 gene, indicating that the defect may lie in hexokinase II regulation.

== Interactions ==
HK2 is known to interact with:

- VDAC.

== Interactive pathway map ==
Click on genes, proteins and metabolites below to link to respective articles. (Note: The interactive pathway map can be edited at WikiPathways: "GlycolysisGluconeogenesis_WP534".)

Glycolysis and Gluconeogenesis edit

== See also ==
- Hexokinase
- Hexokinase I
- Hexokinase III
- Glucokinase
