= Glucokinase regulatory protein =

GCKR

Identifiers
- Aliases: GCKR, FGQTL5, GKRP, glucokinase (hexokinase 4) regulator, glucokinase regulator, fructose swodkoreceptor
- External IDs: OMIM: 600842; MGI: 1096345; GeneCards: GCKR
Available structures
PDB	Ortholog search: PDBe RCSB
PDB	List of PDB id codes 4PXS, 4BBA, 4MQU, 4OLH, 4MSU, 4BB9, 4OHP, 4OP1, 4OP3, 4OHM, 4OHO, 4MRO, 4PX2, 4PX3, 4PX5, 4OHK, 4LY9, 4OP2

Gene location (Human)
Chr.	Chromosome 2 (human)
Band	2p23.3	Start	27,496,839 bp
Band	2p23.3	End	27,523,684 bp

Gene location (Mouse)
Chr.	Chromosome 5 (mouse)
Band	5 B1|5 17.27 cM	Start	31,454,787 bp
Band	5 B1|5 17.27 cM	End	31,484,658 bp
RNA expression pattern
Bgee	Human / Mouse (ortholog); Top expressed in: right lobe of liver; left adrenal cortex; right adrenal gland; left ovary; right adrenal cortex; right ovary; pancreatic ductal cell; gastric mucosa; gonad; body of stomach / Top expressed in: left lobe of liver; neural layer of retina; right lobe of liver; zygote; primary oocyte; pineal gland; ciliary body; embryo; secondary oocyte; iris; More reference expression data
BioGPS	n/a
Gene ontology
Molecular function	protein binding; fructose-6-phosphate binding; carbohydrate derivative binding; enzyme inhibitor activity; enzyme binding; carbohydrate binding
Cellular component	nucleoplasm; nucleus; cytosol; cytoplasm; mitochondrion
Biological process	negative regulation of glucokinase activity; response to fructose; triglyceride homeostasis; urate metabolic process; carbohydrate derivative metabolic process; regulation of glycolytic process; carbohydrate metabolic process; glucose homeostasis; protein import into nucleus
Sources:Amigo / QuickGO
Orthologs
Databases	NCBI: entry; OMA: entry
Species	Human	Mouse
Entrez	2646	231103
Ensembl	ENSG00000084734	ENSMUSG00000059434
UniProt	Q14397	Q91X44
RefSeq (mRNA)	NM_001486	NM_144909; NM_001374741
RefSeq (protein)	NP_001477	NP_659158; NP_001361670
Location (UCSC)	Chr 2: 27.5 – 27.52 Mb	Chr 5: 31.45 – 31.48 Mb
PubMed search
- Wikidata
View/Edit Human	View/Edit Mouse

glucokinase (hexokinase 4) regulator

Identifiers
- Symbol: GCKR
- NCBI gene: 2646
- HGNC: 4196
- OMIM: 600842
- RefSeq: NM_001486
- UniProt: Q14397

Other data
- Locus: Chr. 2 p23
Search for
- Structures: Swiss-model
- Domains: InterPro

The glucokinase regulatory protein (GKRP) also known as glucokinase (hexokinase 4) regulator (GCKR) is a protein produced in hepatocytes (liver cells). GKRP binds and moves glucokinase (GK), thereby controlling both activity and intracellular location of this key enzyme of glucose metabolism. GKRP has also been proposed as one of the fructose-sensing receptors and glucokinase as one of its signal transducers.

GKRP is a 68 kD protein of 626 amino acids. It is coded for by a 19 exon gene, GCKR, on the short arm of chromosome 2 (2p23). GKRP was discovered by Emile van Schaftingen and reported in 1989.

== Physiological function ==
Glucokinase (GK) in liver cells phosphorylates glucose, preparing it for incorporation into glycogen or for glycolysis. During periods of ample glucose supply, most GK activity can be found in the peripheral cytoplasm where glycogen synthesis is occurring. As the glucose supply declines during periods of fasting, GK activity in the cytoplasm diminishes. GKRP participates in this modulation of GK activity and location by binding free cytoplasmic GK as glucose levels decline, and moving it into the nucleus, where it is held in reserve in an inactive form. As glucose and insulin levels rise, as during digestion of a meal, GK is released from GKRP and moves back to the cytoplasm, where much of it associates with the bifunctional enzyme.

In hepatocytes of various mammals, GKRP has always been found in molar excess of the amount of GK, but the GKRP:GK ratio varies according to diet, insulin sufficiency, and other factors. Free GKRP shuttles between the nucleus and the cytoplasm. It may be attached to the microfilament cytoskeleton.

GKRP competes with glucose to bind with GK, but inactivates it when bound. In conditions of low glucose, GKRP then pulls the GK into the nucleus. Rising amounts of glucose coming into the hepatocyte prompt the GKRP to rapidly release GK to return to the cytoplasm.

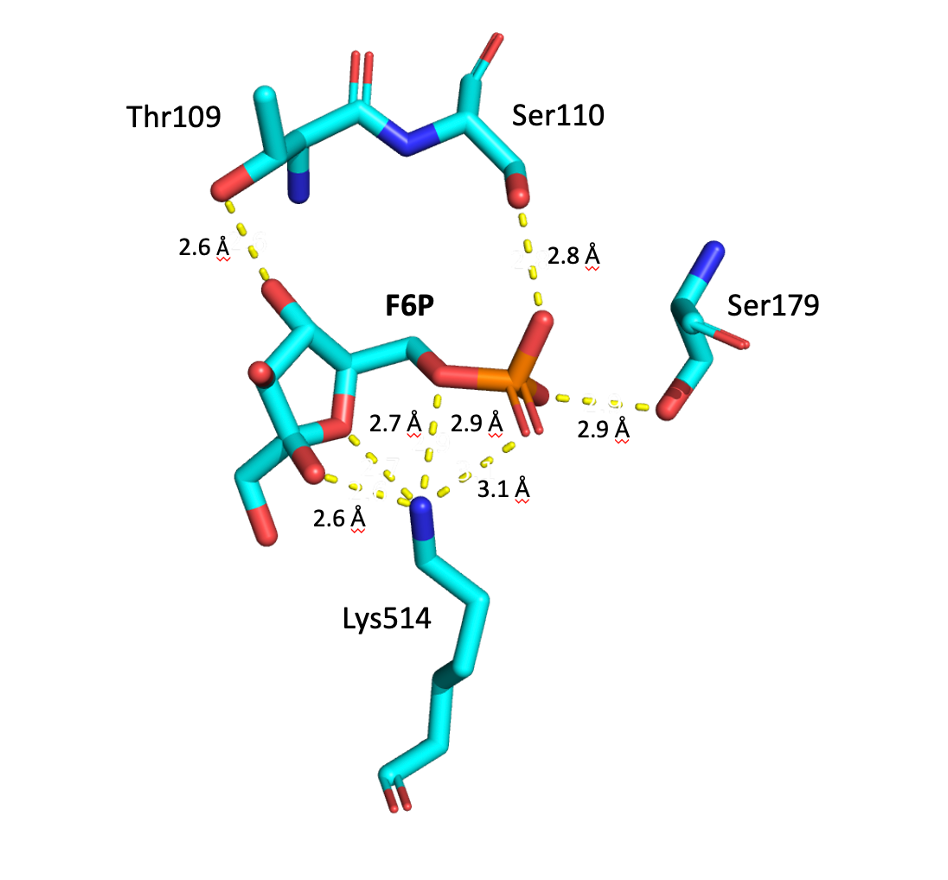
Key residues within the F6P binding site of GKRP. PBD 4lc9

GKRP itself is subject to modulation. Fructose and sorbitol can both be converted to fructose-1-phosphate, which inhibits GKRP and frees GK. Fructose 6-phosphate (F6P) binds to the same site of GKRP, but enhances the ability of GKRP to bind and inactivate GK. F6P induces a conformational change in GKRP which promotes the formation of the glucokinase-GKRP complex, thereby increasing the ability of GKRP to inhibit glucokinase. Residues Ser110, Ser179, Lys514, and Thr109 (using amino acid numbering based on the Homo sapiens GKRP sequence) within the binding site for F6P were determined to be critical to the ability of F6P to induce this conformational change in GKRP. Mutations of these residues resulted in proteins that were 5-fold (S110), 10-fold (T109), and 50-fold (S179 and K514) less effective inhibitors glucokinase and had significantly reduced affinity for F6P.In contrast, phosphorylation of GKRP by AMP-activated protein kinase, induced by elevated levels of AMP, reduces its capacity to inactivate GK.

== Presence of GKRP in other organs ==
A presence and role of GKRP in other organs and tissues beyond the liver remains uncertain. Some researchers have finding small amounts of GKRP, or at least RNA coding for it, in small amounts in certain rat lung cells, in pancreatic islet cells, and in periventricular neurons of the hypothalamus in rats, but physiological function and significance in these organs are unknown.

== Species differences ==
GKRP was originally discovered in rat liver. GKRP was found to serve a similar function in livers of mice and humans as well as other animals. Cats are unusual in lacking GK activity, and have also been found to lack GKRP, though the genes for both GK and GKRP can be identified in the feline genome.

== Clinical significance ==
Many mutant forms of human GK are associated with impaired or amplified insulin secretion or action, resulting in higher or lower blood glucose levels, and either diabetes (MODY2) or hyperinsulinemic hypoglycemia, respectively. Some of these variants have altered interaction with GKRP, which may contribute to the hyperglycemia.

The glucokinase of "knockout mice" who lack GKRP has a reduced expression and is entirely found in the cytoplasm. The knockout mice do not respond rapidly to glucose, exhibiting impaired glucose tolerance. Mutations of the GKRP gene (GCKR) in humans have been sought as possible causes of monogenic diabetes (MODY), but no examples have yet been discovered. However, variant forms of GCKR have been found to be associated with small differences in levels of glucose, insulin, triglycerides, C-reactive protein, and higher or lower risks for type 2 diabetes mellitus.

Activators of GK are being investigated as possible medicines for type 2 diabetes. One of the mechanisms of activation may be protection from binding by GKRP.
