= Basic helix-loop-helix leucine zipper transcription factors =

Type of transcription factor

Basic helix-loop-helix leucine zipper (bHLH-LZ) transcription factors are a family of transcription factors containing both basic helix-loop-helix and leucine zipper motifs. They have important roles in cellular development, differentiation and cell proliferation.

Examples include Microphthalmia-associated transcription factor (MITF) and Sterol regulatory element binding protein (SREBP).
