= ADP-specific glucokinase =

Class of enzyme

Identifiers
- EC no.: 2.7.1.147
- CAS no.: 173585-07-4

Databases
- BRENDA: enzyme data
- ExPASy: NiceZyme view
- KEGG: enzyme entry
- MetaCyc: metabolic pathway
- Rhea: reactions
- PDB structures: RCSB PDB PDBe PDBsum
- Gene Ontology: AmiGO / QuickGO
Search
- PMC: articles
- PubMed: articles
- NCBI: proteins

ADPGK

Identifiers
- Aliases: ADPGK, 2610017G09Rik, ADP-GK, ADP-specific glucokinase, ADP-dependent glucokinase, ADP dependent glucokinase
- External IDs: OMIM: 611861; MGI: 1919391; GeneCards: ADPGK
Enzyme activity
EC #	BRENDA	ExPASy	KEGG	MetaCyc
2.7.1.147	↗	↗	↗	↗

Gene location (Human)
Chr.	Chromosome 15 (human)
Band	15q24.1	Start	72,751,294 bp
Band	15q24.1	End	72,785,846 bp

Gene location (Mouse)
Chr.	Chromosome 9 (mouse)
Band	9|9 B	Start	59,198,841 bp
Band	9|9 B	End	59,231,335 bp
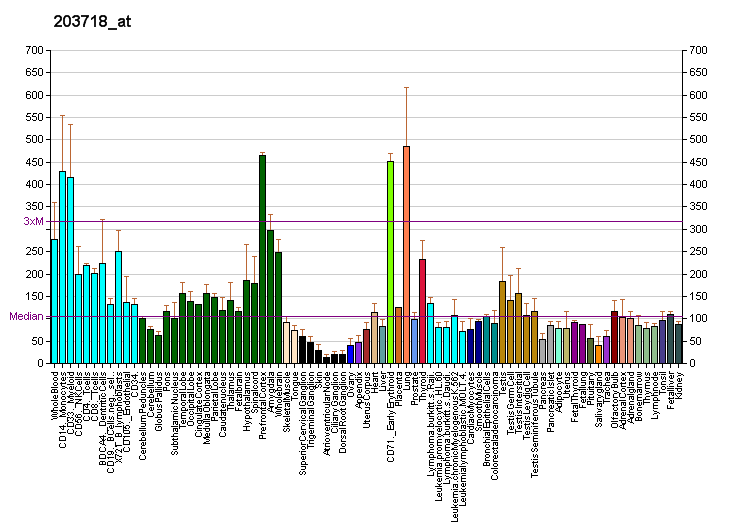
RNA expression pattern
Bgee	Human / Mouse (ortholog); Top expressed in: oocyte; monocyte; secondary oocyte; granulocyte; spleen; bone marrow cell; blood; upper lobe of left lung; appendix; body of pancreas / Top expressed in: secondary oocyte; bone marrow; yolk sac; cumulus cell; somite; proximal tubule; lip; blood; spermatocyte; molar; More reference expression data
BioGPS	More reference expression data
Gene ontology
Molecular function	phosphotransferase activity, alcohol group as acceptor; transferase activity; metal ion binding; kinase activity; ADP-specific glucokinase activity
Cellular component	endoplasmic reticulum; membrane; extracellular region; endoplasmic reticulum membrane
Biological process	glycolytic process; phosphorylation; glucose metabolic process; canonical glycolysis; carbohydrate metabolic process
Sources:Amigo / QuickGO
Orthologs
Databases	NCBI: entry; OMA: entry
Species	Human	Mouse
Entrez	83440	72141
Ensembl	ENSG00000159322	ENSMUSG00000025236
UniProt	Q9BRR6	Q8VDL4
RefSeq (mRNA)	NM_031284; NM_001365223; NM_001365224; NM_001365225; NM_001365226 NM_001365227; NM_001365228; NM_001365229	NM_028121; NM_001359282
RefSeq (protein)	NP_112574; NP_001352152; NP_001352153; NP_001352154; NP_001352155 NP_001352156; NP_001352157; NP_001352158	NP_082397; NP_001346211
Location (UCSC)	Chr 15: 72.75 – 72.79 Mb	Chr 9: 59.2 – 59.23 Mb
PubMed search
- Wikidata
View/Edit Human	View/Edit Mouse

ADP-specific glucokinase (EC 2.7.1.147) also known as ADP-dependent glucokinase is an enzyme that catalyzes the chemical reaction

ADP +
D-glucose
AMP +
glucose 6-phosphate

The enzyme characterised from Pyrococcus furiosus converts D-glucose to its monophosphate, glucose 6-phosphate, by transferring a phosphate group from the cofactor, adenosine diphosphate (ADP), which is converted to adenosine monophosphate (AMP). A similar enzyme has also been found in Thermococcus kodakarensis, where it acts on glucosamine as well as glucose.

In humans, the ADP-dependent glucokinase is encoded by the ADPGK gene.

== Structural studies ==
Examples of the ADP-dependent glucokinase structure solved by x-ray crystallography include the enzyme from mouse PDB accession code 5CCF and Archaea PDB: 1GC5.
