= Hexose phosphate uptake =

The Uptake of Hexose Phosphates (Uhp) is a protein system found in bacteria. It is a type of two-component sensory transduction pathway which helps bacteria react to their environment.

== Protein components ==
The uhp system is composed of UhpA, UhpB, UhpC, and UhpT. UhpB and UhpC are both transmembrane proteins which form a complex with each other. UhpA is a signal protein found in the cytoplasm. UhpT is a transporter protein which facilitates the uptake of phosphorylated hexose molecules into the cell.

== Functionality ==
The Uhp system uptakes phosphorylated hexose sugars into bacteria. The system is triggered by phosphorylated hexose sugars on the outside of the cell. UhpC binds to the phosphorylated hexose, which allows the phosphorylation of UhpB on one of its cytoplasmic histidines. This facilitates the phosphorylation of an aspartate on UhpA, and the phosphorylated UhpA activates the transcription of UhpT. UhpT then facilitates the transport of the phosphorylated hexose sugars into the cell.
