= Myotonia congenita =

Genetic disorder causing muscles to delay relaxing after contraction

- Other names: Congenital myotonia, Thomsen syndrome, Becker syndrome
- Specialty: Neurology
- Symptoms: Delayed relaxation of muscles, falls, difficulty swallowing
- Usual onset: Childhood
- Types: Autosomal dominant (Thomsen disease), autosomal recessive (Becker disease)
- Causes: Genetic, CLCN1 mutations
- Diagnostic method: Clinical, genetic testing
- Differential diagnosis: Myotonic dystrophy, Paramyotonia congenita
- Treatment: Physiotherapy, medication
- Medication: quinine, phenytoin, carbamazepine, mexiletine
- Frequency: 1 in 10,000 (Finland) - 1 in 100,000 (worldwide)

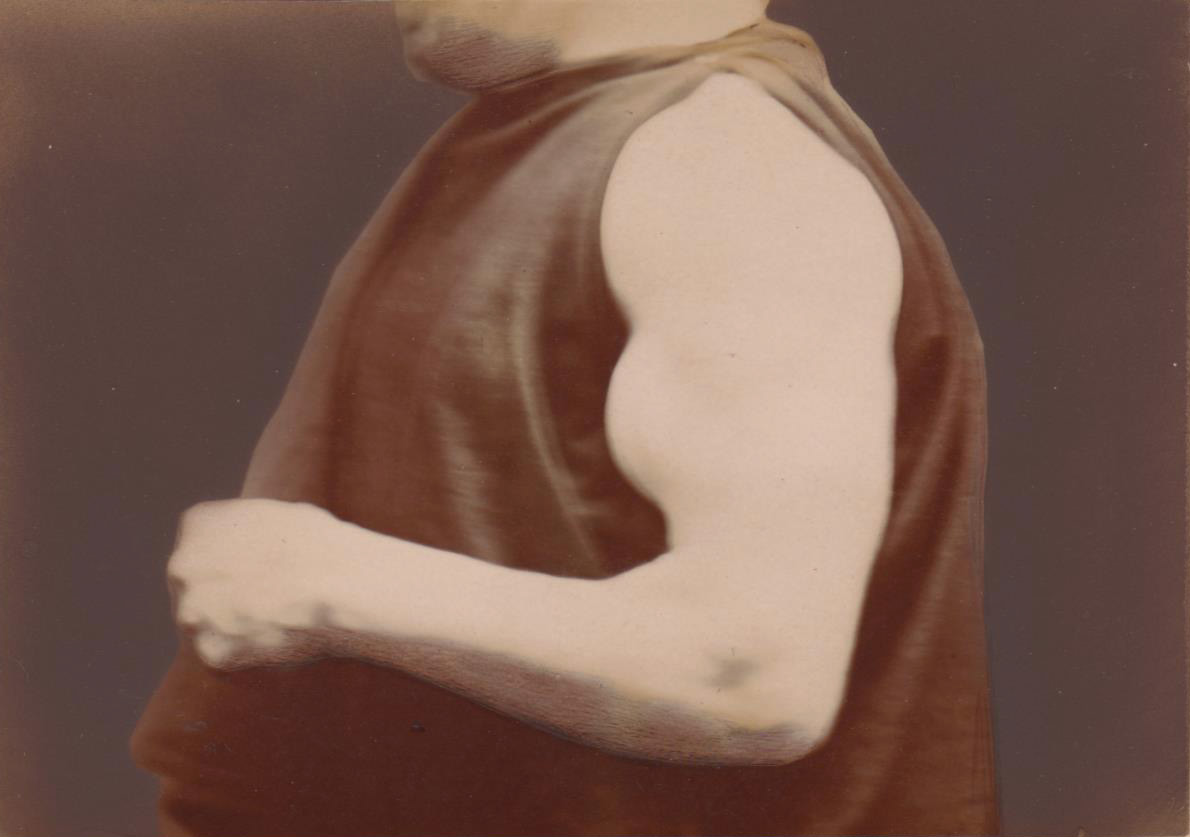
Clinical photograph depicting a patient with Thomsen's disease in 1894 (Sorbonne University).

Myotonia congenita is a congenital neuromuscular channelopathy that affects skeletal muscles (muscles used for movement). It is a genetic disorder. The hallmark of the disease is the failure of initiated contraction to terminate, often referred to as delayed relaxation of the muscles (myotonia) and rigidity. Symptoms include delayed relaxation of the muscles after voluntary contraction (myotonia), and may also include stiffness, hypertrophy (enlargement), transient weakness in some forms of the disorder (from certain genetic mutations), severe masseter spasm, and cramping. The condition is sometimes referred to as fainting goat syndrome, as it is responsible for the eponymous 'fainting' seen in fainting goats when presented with a sudden stimulus. Of note, myotonia congenita is associated with increased risk of malignant hyperthermia (MH) during general anaesthetic.

== Symptoms and signs ==
The prolonged muscle contractions, which occur most commonly in the leg muscles in recessive mutations, and more commonly in the hands, face, and eyelids in dominant mutations, are often enhanced by inactivity, and in some forms are relieved by repetitive movement known as "the warm-up effect". This effect often diminishes quickly with rest. Some individuals with myotonia congenita are prone to falling as a result of hasty movements or an inability to stabilize themselves after a loss of balance. During a fall, a person with myotonia congenita may experience partial or complete rigid paralysis that will quickly resolve once the event is over. However, a fall into cold water may render the person unable to move for the duration of submergence. As with myotonic goats, children are more prone to falling than adults, due to their impulsivity.

The two major types of myotonia congenita are distinguished by the severity of their symptoms and their patterns of inheritance. Becker disease usually appears later in childhood than Thomsen disease, and causes more severe myotonia, muscle stiffness and transient weakness. Although myotonia in itself is not normally associated with pain, cramps or myalgia may develop. People with Becker disease often experience temporary attacks of muscle weakness, particularly in the arms and hands, brought on by movement after periods of rest. They may also develop mild, permanent muscle weakness over time. This muscle weakness is not observed in people with Thomsen disease. However, in recent times, as more of the individual mutations that cause myotonia congenita are identified, these limited disease classifications are becoming less widely used.

Early symptoms in a child may include:

- Difficulty swallowing
- Gagging
- Stiff movements that improve when they are repeated
- Frequent falling
- Difficulties opening eyelids after strenuous contraction or crying (von Graefe's sign)

Possible complications may include:

- Aspiration pneumonia (caused by swallowing difficulties)
- Frequent choking or gagging in infants (also caused by swallowing difficulties)
- Abdominal muscle weakness
- Chronic joint problems
- Injury due to falls

=== Phenotypic variability ===
Both Thomsen and Becker myotonia have high phenotype variability. Severity of symptoms can vary greatly between individuals and throughout the lives of the individuals themselves. This may be partly because there are over 130 currently known different mutations that can cause the disorder, each with their own specifics, and also because myotonia congenita is an ion channel disorder, and ion channels are sensitive to internal and external environmental factors. It has been shown that pregnancy and the use of diuretics aggravate myotonia, and both these conditions are linked to the loss of divalent cations such as magnesium and calcium. It has further been shown that in chemically-induced myotonia in isolated rat muscle, myotonia could be dampened by increasing the magnesium and calcium content of the extracellular medium. This has also been shown for isolated human muscle.

Adrenaline/epinephrine is well known to make myotonia worse in most individuals with the disorder, and a person with myotonia congenita may experience a sudden increase in difficulty with mobility in a particularly stressful situation during which adrenaline is released.

Due to the invisible nature of the disorder, the fact that those with myotonia congenita often appear very fit and able bodied, the general lack of knowledge about the disorder by the general and medical community, and often by the individual themselves, and the potential for inconsistency with the symptoms, many people with myotonia congenita have experienced a degree of social persecution at one time or another because of the effects of their disorder.

=== The warm-up phenomenon ===
This phenomenon was described along with the disease by Thomsen in 1876 but its etiology remains unclear.

Patients report that myotonia congenita may present itself in the following ways (this is from first hand experience). If the person is sedentary and then decides to walk up a set of stairs, by the third or fourth step their leg muscles begin to stiffen significantly, requiring them to slow down almost to a complete stop. But as the muscles loosen up, a few steps later, they can once again begin to climb the steps at a normal pace. If this person plays any kind of a sport, a good warm-up is mandatory. Otherwise if they need to quickly and intensively use their muscles, such as in a sprint race or a basketball game, their muscles will freeze up, causing them to slow down or almost come to a complete stop. But once the muscles are warmed up, they can once again function normally. This can happen in various muscles, even in muscles such as the tongue. For example, if a person has not spoken for awhile and then wants to speak, their tongue may be stiff at first causing the words to come out a little garbled, but after a few seconds of trying to speak, the tongue muscle will loosen up and then they can speak normally for the remainder of the time that they are conversing.

Patients report that repeated contraction of muscle alleviates present myotonia with each contraction, such that myotonia is almost absent after a few contractions of the same muscle. The effect lasts about five minutes. There have been several proposed mechanisms for this phenomenon, but none have been demonstrated conclusively; one hypothesis is that the Na+/K+-ATPase is stimulated during the myotonic activity by increased intracellular Na^{+} in the cytosol of the muscle cell, increasing the activity of the Na+/K+-ATPase. However, in experiments with patients where the Na+/K+-ATPase had been blocked in the underarm by infusion of the Na+/K+-ATPase-blocker Ouabain, no effect on warm-up was observed. Another hypothesis states that the few remaining functional chloride channels in muscle may become more active with increased muscle activity.

It has been proposed that inactivation of sodium channel protein type 4 subunit alpha, residing in skeletal muscle, could play an important role in the warm-up phenomenon. In particular, slow inactivation of the channel is believed to have a spatial and temporal extent that is correlated to warm-up and therefore may provide a plausible cause.

== Causes ==
The disorder is caused by mutations in part of a gene (CLCN1) encoding the ClC-1 chloride channel, resulting in muscle fiber membranes having an unusually exaggerated response to stimulation (hyperexcitability).

Three cases have been reported who were diagnosed with Thomsen's myotonia and proved on genetic testing not to have mutations in the chloride gene but rather in the alpha-subunit of the voltage gated sodium channel (SCN4A). Like chloride channel mutations, patients with sodium channel mutations may have a very varied phenotype, making a diagnosis more difficult.

== Mechanisms ==
Myotonia congenita is caused in humans by loss-of-function mutations in the gene CLCN1. This is the gene encoding the protein CLCN1, that forms the ClC-1 chloride channel, critical for the normal function of skeletal muscle cells. This gene is also associated with the condition in horses, goats, and dogs. In short, in lack of sufficient functional chloride channels, the muscle fiber membrane becomes hyper-excitable and continues to be electrically active (firing action potentials) when stimulated, for longer periods of time, than a normal muscle fiber. This results in prolonged contraction/delayed relaxation of the muscle.

The dysfunctional Cl^{−} channels are located in the muscle fiber membrane and do not affect the motor nerve innervating the muscle. However, many studies have shown that denervation of muscle fibers alter the resting membrane conductance, but whether this affects myotonia in the muscle has been subject to heavy debate, and results from experiments are inconclusive.

In skeletal muscle fibers, a large transverse tubule system with a high surface-area to volume ratio exists. The onset of skeletal muscle activity is associated with the initiation and propagation of action potentials again associated with an efflux of K^{+} to the extracellular fluid and transverse tubule system. When many action potentials are elicited subsequently more K^{+} is expelled from the cell into the transverse tubular system. As K^{+} accumulates in the transverse tubular system the equilibrium potential for K^{+} (E_{K^{+}}) normally around -80 mV, becomes more depolarized (depolarization), according to the Nernst equation. In skeletal muscle fibers the equilibrium potential for Cl^{−} is around -80 mV, equal to that of K^{+} at rest. Cl^{−} moves towards its equilibrium potential around -80 mV, while potassium moves towards its equilibrium potential more depolarized than -80 mV during activity. This results in a slightly more depolarized membrane potential of the fiber during repeated action potentials, see Goldman equation. The Na^{+} conductance is only elevated shortly compared to the K^{+} conductance during each action potential, which is why K^{+} largely determines the membrane potential (Cl^{−} is passively distributed during rest). In the case of myotonia congenita, the chloride channels that allow Cl^{−} to move across the membrane towards its equilibrium potential are defective, thus K^{+} is the only ion determining the membrane potential, and as more and more K^{+} accumulates in the transverse tubular system with each subsequent action potential the fiber depolarizes until the membrane potential comes close enough to the action potential threshold for spontaneous activity to ensue Spontaneous action potentials can arise for several seconds, leading to the delayed relaxation that is the hallmark of myotonia. Cessation of spontaneous activity is associated with sodium channel inactivation (Na_{v}1.4).

== Diagnosis ==
=== Types ===
Two types of myotonia congenita exist, an autosomal dominant form and an autosomal recessive form. Autosomal dominant myotonia congenita (OMIM #160800) is also called Thomsen disease, after Danish/German physician Asmus Julius Thomas Thomsen (1815–1896), who himself had the disease and who wrote the first description of it in the medical literature (in 1876). Autosomal recessive myotonia congenita (OMIM #255700) is also called generalized myotonia, recessive generalized myotonia (RGM), Becker disease, and Becker myotonia, after the German professor Peter Emil Becker, who discovered its recessive nature.

The term congenital in its sense of "clinically apparent from birth" applies only to Thomsen disease, as the clinical onset of Becker myotonia may be delayed up to the age of 4 to 6 years. But in either form of myotonia congenita, the term's strictest sense reflects that the disease is genetically present from birth, although the clinical onset may be delayed.With the advent of genetic testing, it has recently been found that some typically recessive mutations may occur in a dominant fashion in some individuals. The reason for this is not known.

Because several CLCN1 mutations can cause either Becker disease or Thomsen disease, doctors usually rely on characteristic signs and symptoms to distinguish the two forms of myotonia congenita. However, myotonia caused by CLCN1 mutations can occasionally be clinically indistinguishable from myotonia caused by sodium channel mutations (SCN4A mutations) resulting in the similar disease paramyotonia congenita.

A so-called Finnish heritage disease, congenital myotonia is more common in Finland and among ethnic Finns. A molecular study of the CLCN1 gene in 24 families in northern Finland, including 46 affected individuals, showed that although the inheritance appeared to be dominant (Thomsen type), in fact it is recessive (Becker type).

=== Differential diagnosis ===
Sodium channel myotonias (SCN4A)

- Potassium-aggravated myotonia (acetazolamide responsive myotonia)
- Paramyotonia congenita
- Hyperkalemic periodic paralysis

Dystrophies

- Myotonic dystrophy (myotonic muscular dystrophy: Type 1 and Type 2)

Potassium channel disorders (KCNJ2)

- Andersen-Tawil syndrome

Other disorders

- Thyroid disorders
- Neuromyotonia (Isaacs Syndrome)
- Schwartz–Jampel syndrome
- Stiff person syndrome
- Brody myopathy (Brody Disease, Brody's Disease, Brody's Myopathy)

== Treatment ==
Some cases of myotonia congenita do not require treatment, or it is determined that the risks of the medication outweigh the benefits. If necessary, however, symptoms of the disorder may be relieved with quinine, ranolazine, procainamide, flecainide, phenytoin, carbamazepine, mexiletine and other anticonvulsant drugs. Physical therapy and other rehabilitative measures may also be used to help muscle function. Genetic counseling is available.

== Epidemiology ==
In northern Scandinavia, the prevalence of myotonia congenita has been estimated at 1:10,000.Myotonia congenita is estimated to affect 1 in 100,000 people worldwide.

== Research ==
The name Thomsen's disease refers to the Danish physician Julius Thomsen (1815–1896) who described the condition in himself and his family.

Myotonia can be achieved in preparations of intact isolated muscle by the administration of 9-Anthracenecarboxylic acid, a blocker of chloride channels. It is also possible to achieve myotonia in preparations of intact isolated muscle by greatly lowering or removing the extracellular content of chloride in the bathing medium.During the 1970s several murine models of myotonia appeared. One in particular has been used widely, the adr mouse or "arrested development of righting response". This model is often used in scientific work with muscular dystrophy, and displays myotonia due to lack of functional chloride channels.

== See also ==
- Fainting goat
- Tonic immobility
- New Forest pony
