= Steinert =

Steinert is a surname. Notable people with the surname include:

- Damián Steinert (born 1986), Argentine football winger
- Kristin Steinert (born 1987), German bobsledder
- Otto Steinert (1915–1978), German photographer
- Scott Steinert (1962–1997), American gangster
- Vida Steinert (1903/5–1976), New Zealand painter
- Wolfgang Steinert (1940–2010), German electrical engineer
- Hans Gustav Wilhelm Steinert (1875–1911), German physician who first described Myotonic dystrophy, also known as Curschmann-Batten-Steinert syndrome

== See also ==
- Steinert High School, four year comprehensive public high school in Hamilton Township in Mercer County, New Jersey, United States
- Steinert Hall, a concert auditorium developed by the above company
