= Paramyotonia congenita =

Failure of muscles to relax after contraction, which is worsened by exercise

- Other names: Paramyotonia congenita of von Eulenburg or Eulenburg disease
- This condition is inherited in an autosomal dominant manner.
- Specialty: Neurology

Paramyotonia congenita (PC) is a rare congenital autosomal dominant neuromuscular disorder characterized by "paradoxical" myotonia. This type of myotonia has been termed paradoxical because it becomes worse with exercise whereas classical myotonia, as seen in myotonia congenita, is alleviated by exercise. PC is also distinguished as it can be induced by cold temperatures. Although more typical of the periodic paralytic disorders, patients with PC may also have potassium-provoked paralysis. PC typically presents within the first decade of life and has 100% penetrance. Patients with this disorder commonly present with myotonia in the face or upper extremities. The lower extremities are generally less affected. While some other related disorders result in muscle atrophy, this is not normally the case with PC. This disease can also present as hyperkalemic periodic paralysis and there is debate as to whether the two disorders are actually distinct.

== Symptoms and signs ==
Patients typically complain of muscle stiffness that can continue to focal weakness. This muscle stiffness cannot be walked off, in contrast to myotonia congenita. These symptoms are increased (and sometimes induced) in cold environments. For example, some patients have reported that eating ice cream leads to a stiffening of the throat. For other patients, exercise consistently induces symptoms of myotonia or weakness. Typical presentations of this are during squatting or repetitive fist clenching. Some patients also indicate that specific foods are able to induce symptoms of paramyotonia congenita. Isolated cases have reported that carrots and watermelon are able to induce these symptoms. The canonical definition of this disorder precludes permanent weakness in the definition of this disorder. In practice, however, this has not been strictly adhered to in the literature.

== Pathophysiology ==
Paramyotonia congenita (as well as hyperkalemic periodic paralysis and the potassium-aggravated myotonias) is caused by mutations in a sodium channel, SCN4A. The phenotype of patients with these mutations is indicated in Table 1. These mutations affect fast inactivation of the encoded sodium channel. There are also indications that some mutations lead to altered activation and deactivation. The result of these alterations in channel kinetics is that there is prolonged inward (depolarizing) current following muscle excitation. There is also the introduction of a "window current" due to changes in the voltage sensitivity of the channel’s kinetics. These lead to a general increase in cellular excitability, as shown in figure 1.

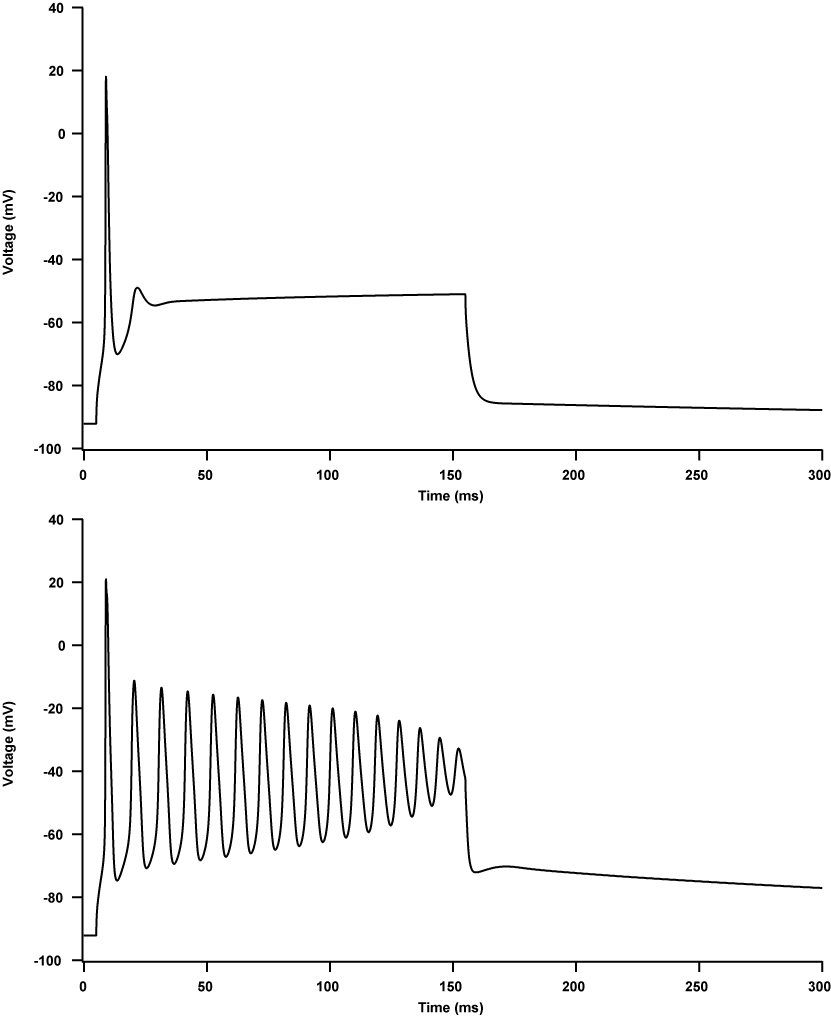
Figure 1. Theoretical simulation of a muscle membrane potential in response to 150 ms depolarizing pulse of −45 pA. (A) Normal muscle produces only a single action potential due to such stimulus. This is due to inactivation of sodium channels, preventing their further activation even during depolarization. (B) Myotonic muscle, however, is hyperexcitable and able to produce action potentials for the duration of the stimulus pulse. This model adapted from Cannon, 1993.

There has been one study of a large number of patients with paramyotonia congenita. Of 26 kindreds, it found that 17 (71%) had a mutation in SCN4A while 6 (29%) had no known mutation. There is no large difference between these two groups except that patients with no known mutation have attacks precipitated less by cold but more by hunger, are much more likely to have normal muscle biopsies, and show less decreased compound muscle action potentials when compared to patients with known mutations.

Table 1. Summary of mutations found in patients diagnosed with paramyotonia congenita and their resulting phenotypes
| Mutation | Region | Myotonia | | | Weakness | | | References |
| Mutation | Region | Cold | Exercise/ Activity | Potassium | Cold | Exercise/ Activity | Potassium | References |
|---|---|---|---|---|---|---|---|---|
| R672C | D2S4 | ? | ? | ? | ? | ? | ? | |
| I693T | D2S4-S5 | N | ? | ? | Y | Y | Y | |
| T704M* | D2S5 | Y | ? | ? | Y | Y | Y | ^{,}^{,}^{,} |
| S804F** | D2S6 | Y | Y | Y | ? | Y | N | |
| A1152D | D3S4-S5 | Y | ? | ? | ? | ? | ? | |
| A1156T* | D3S4-S5 | Y | ? | ? | ? | Y | ? | ^{,} |
| V1293I | D3S4 | Y | Y | N | ? | ? | N | |
| G1306V** | D3-4 | Y | Y | Y | ? | ? | Y | ^{,} |
| T1313A | D3-4 | Y | Y | N | Y | Y | N | |
| T1313M | D3-4 | Y | Y | N | Y | Y**** | N | ^{,} |
| M1360V* | D4S1 | ? | ? | ? | Y | Y | ? | |
| M1370V* | D4S1 | Y | Y | N | N | N | Y | |
| L1433R | D4S3 | Y | Y | Y | ? | Y***** | N | |
| R1448C | D4S4 | Y | Y | N | N | Y | N | ^{,}^{,}^{,} |
| R1448H | D4S4 | Y | Y | Y | Y | Y | ? | ^{,}^{,}^{,} |
| R1448P | D4S4 | Y | Y | ? | Y | ? | N | |
| R1448S | D4S4 | Y | Y | N | ? | Y | N | |
| R1456E | D4S4 | Y | Y | N | N | N | N | |
| V1458F*** | D4S4 | ? | ? | ? | ? | ? | ? | |
| F1473S*** | D4S4-S5 | ? | ? | ? | ? | ? | ? | |
| M1592V* | D4S6 | Y | Y | Y | Y | Y | Y | ^{,}^{,}^{,}^{,}^{,}^{,} |
| E1702K | C-term | ? | ? | N | ? | ? | N | |
| F1795I | C-term | Y | ? | ? | ? | ? | ? | |
| * ** *** **** ***** | Symptoms of both PC and hyperKPP (Periodica paralytica paramyotonica); Also diagnosed as a Potassium-aggravated myotonia Original case reports unpublished. When exercised in a cold environment After muscles were cooled | | | | | | | |
This table was adapted from Vicart et al., 2005. "Cold" refers to symptoms either occurring or significantly worsening with cold temperatures. Likewise, "Exercise/Activity" refers to symptom onset or severity worsening with exercise and/or more general movement like hand clenching. "Potassium" refers to ingestion of food high in potassium or other disorders which are known to increase serum potassium levels. Mutation region nomenclature is: domain number (e.g., D1) followed by segment number (e.g., S4). Thus, D2S3 indicates that the mutation is in the 3rd membrane spanning loop of the 2nd domain. Some mutations occur between segments and are denoted similarly (e.g., D4S4-S5 occurs between the 4th and 5th segments of the 4th domain). Other mutations are located between domains and are denoted DX-Y where X and Y are domain numbers. C-term refers to the carboxy-terminus.

== Diagnosis ==
Diagnosis of paramyotonia congenita is made upon evaluation of patient symptoms and case history. Myotonia must increase with exercise or movement and usually must worsen in cold temperatures. Patients that present with permanent weakness are normally not characterized as having PC. Electromyography may be used to distinguish between paramyotonia congenita and myotonia congenita.^{,} Clinicians may also attempt to provoke episodes or myotonia and weakness/paralysis in patients in order to determine whether the patient has PC, hyperkalemic periodic paralysis, or one of the potassium-aggravated myotonias. Genomic sequencing of the SCN4A gene is the definitive diagnostic determinant.

== Treatment ==
Some patients do not require treatment to manage the symptoms of paramyotonia congenita. Others require treatment for their muscle stiffness and often find mexiletine to be helpful. Others have found acetazolamide to be helpful as well. Avoidance of myotonia triggering events is also an effective method of myotonia prevention.

== Epidemiology ==
Paramyotonia congenita is considered an extremely rare disorder, though little epidemiological work has been done. Prevalence is generally higher in European-derived populations and lower among Asians. Epidemiological estimates have been provided for the German population. There, it was estimated that the prevalence of PC is between 1:350,000 (0.00028%) and 1:180,000 (0.00056%). However, the German population of patients with PC is not uniformly distributed across the country. Many individuals with PC herald from the Ravensberg area in North-West Germany, where a founder effect seems to be responsible for most cases. The prevalence here is estimated at 1:6000 or 0.017%.

== History ==
Originally thought to be separate from hyperkalemic periodic paralysis and the sodium channel myotonias, there is now considerable disagreement as to whether these disorders represent separate entities or overlapping phenotypes of a complex disorder spectrum. It was once thought that paramyotonia congenita was more common in males. Observation of the most recent generation has shown this to be untrue. On average, half of children in a family inherit the disorder regardless of gender.

== Notes ==
- Lehmann-Horn F, Rüdel R, Ricker K (1993). "Non-dystrophic myotonias and periodic paralyses. A European Neuromuscular Center Workshop held 4–6 October 1992, Ulm, Germany". Neuromuscul Disord. 3 (2): 161–8. doi:10.1016/0960-8966(93)90009-9. PMID 7689382. S2CID 20892960.
- Cannon S (2006). "Pathomechanisms in channelopathies of skeletal muscle and brain". Annu Rev Neurosci. 29: 387–415. doi:10.1146/annurev.neuro.29.051605.112815. PMID 16776591.
