= ODC internal ribosome entry site (IRES) =

RNA element

In molecular biology, the ODC internal ribosome entry site (IRES) is an RNA element present in the 5′ UTR of the mRNA encoding ornithine decarboxylase. It has been suggested that this IRES allows cap-independent translation of ornithine decarboxylase at the G2/M phase of the cell cycle, however there is some doubt about this. Translation from this IRES is activated by the zinc finger protein ZNF9 and by Poly(rC)-binding protein 2 (PCBP2). It is also activated in Ras-transformed cells.

== See also ==
- Ornithine decarboxylase
- Internal ribosome entry site
