= SCN4A =

Protein found in humans

Identifiers
- Aliases: SCN4A, CMS16, HOKPP2, HYKPP, HYPP, NAC1A, Na(V)1.4, Nav1.4, SkM1, sodium voltage-gated channel alpha subunit 4
- External IDs: OMIM: 603967; MGI: 98250; GeneCards: SCN4A

Gene location (Human)
Chr.	Chromosome 17 (human)
Band	17q23.3	Start	63,938,554 bp
Band	17q23.3	End	63,972,918 bp

Gene location (Mouse)
Chr.	Chromosome 11 (mouse)
Band	11 E1|11 68.91 cM	Start	106,209,418 bp
Band	11 E1|11 68.91 cM	End	106,244,114 bp
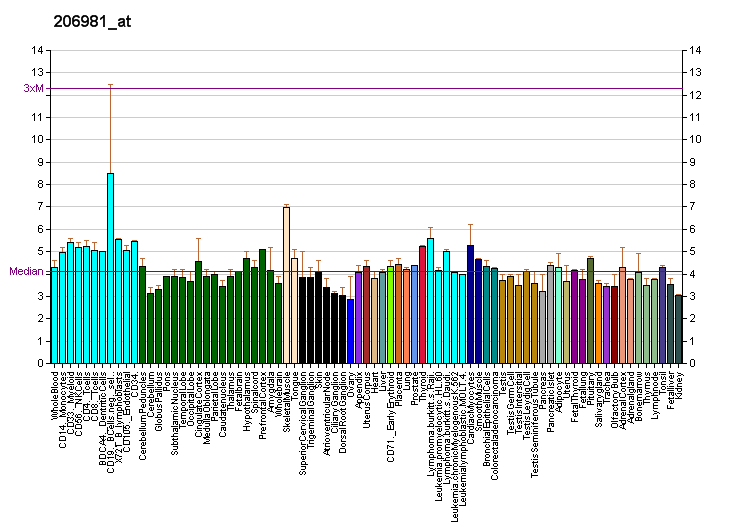
RNA expression pattern
Bgee	Human / Mouse (ortholog); Top expressed in: muscle of thigh; gastrocnemius muscle; Skeletal muscle tissue of rectus abdominis; vastus lateralis muscle; glutes; thoracic diaphragm; triceps brachii muscle; Skeletal muscle tissue of biceps brachii; deltoid muscle; tibialis anterior muscle / Top expressed in: muscle of thigh; triceps brachii muscle; skeletal muscle tissue; medial head of gastrocnemius muscle; temporal muscle; sternocleidomastoid muscle; lip; quadriceps femoris muscle; knee joint; digastric muscle; More reference expression data
BioGPS	More reference expression data
Gene ontology
Molecular function	ion channel activity; sodium channel activity; voltage-gated ion channel activity; voltage-gated sodium channel activity
Cellular component	voltage-gated sodium channel complex; integral component of membrane; integral component of plasma membrane; membrane; plasma membrane; axon
Biological process	regulation of ion transmembrane transport; ion transmembrane transport; muscle contraction; membrane depolarization during action potential; ion transport; neuronal action potential; transmembrane transport; sodium ion transport; sodium ion transmembrane transport
Sources:Amigo / QuickGO
Orthologs
Databases	NCBI: entry; OMA: entry
Species	Human	Mouse
Entrez	6329	110880
Ensembl	ENSG00000007314	ENSMUSG00000001027
UniProt	P35499	Q9ER60
RefSeq (mRNA)	NM_000334	NM_133199
RefSeq (protein)	NP_000325	NP_573462; NP_001390570
Location (UCSC)	Chr 17: 63.94 – 63.97 Mb	Chr 11: 106.21 – 106.24 Mb
PubMed search
- Wikidata
View/Edit Human	View/Edit Mouse

Sodium channel protein type 4 subunit alpha is a protein that in humans is encoded by the SCN4A gene.

The Na_{v}1.4 voltage-gated sodium channel is encoded by the SCN4A gene. Mutations in the gene are associated with hypokalemic periodic paralysis, hyperkalemic periodic paralysis, paramyotonia congenita, and potassium-aggravated myotonia.

== Function ==
Voltage-gated sodium channels are transmembrane glycoprotein complexes composed of a large alpha subunit with 24 transmembrane domains and one or more regulatory beta subunits. They are responsible for the generation and propagation of action potentials in neurons and muscle. This gene encodes one member of the sodium channel alpha subunit gene family. It is expressed in skeletal muscle, and mutations in this gene have been linked to several myotonia and periodic paralysis disorders.

== Clinical significance ==
=== Periodic paralysis ===
In hypokalemic periodic paralysis, arginine residues making up the voltage sensor of Na_{v}1.4 are mutated. The voltage sensor comprises the S4 alpha helix of each of the four transmembrane domains (I-IV) of the protein, and contains basic residues that only allow entry of the positive sodium ions at appropriate membrane voltages by blocking or opening the channel pore. In patients with these mutations, the channel has a reduced excitability and signals from the central nervous system are unable to depolarise muscle. As a result, the muscle cannot contract efficiently, causing paralysis. The condition is hypokalemic because a low extracellular potassium ion concentration will cause the muscle to repolarise to the resting potential more quickly, so even if calcium conductance does occur it cannot be sustained. It becomes more difficult to reach the calcium threshold at which the muscle can contract, and even if this is reached then the muscle is more likely to relax. Because of this, the severity would be reduced if potassium ion concentrations are kept high.

In hyperkalemic periodic paralysis, mutations occur in residues between transmembrane domains III and IV which make up the fast inactivation gate of Na_{v}1.4. Mutations have also been found on the cytoplasmic loops between the S4 and S5 helices of domains II, III and IV, which are the binding sites of the inactivation gate.

In patients with these the channel is unable to inactivate, sodium conductance is sustained and the muscle remains permanently tense. Since the motor end plate is depolarized, further signals to contract have no effect (paralysis). The condition is hyperkalemic because a high extracellular potassium ion concentration will make it even more unfavourable for potassium to leave the cell in order to repolarise it to the resting potential, and this further prolongs the sodium conductance and keeps the muscle contracted. Hence, the severity would be reduced if extracellular (serum) potassium ion concentrations are kept low.

=== Myotonia ===
The same types of mutations cause myotonia and paralysis, however the difference between these phenotypes depends on the level of sodium current that persists. If the conductance fluctuates below the voltage threshold for Na_{v}1.4, then the sodium channels will eventually be able to close, and be depolarised again. Thus, the muscle merely remains contracted for longer than normal (myotonia) but will relax and be able to contract again within a short period. If the conductance settles at a steady state with the sodium pore open and unable to inactivate, then the muscle is unable to relax at all and motor control is completely lost (paralysis).

== Ligands ==
Many components of animal venoms and toxins act as potent blockers of voltage gated sodium channels, though without selectivity for Na_{v}1.4. Notable examples include conotoxins, grayanotoxins, batrachotoxin, aconitine, saxitoxin and tetrodotoxin, among others. Synthetic blockers of Na_{v}1.4 channels include numerous medicines used as anticonvulsants, antiarrhythmic agents, analgesics and muscle relaxants, although all currently used agents block multiple different subtypes and are not highly selective for Na_{v}1.4.

=== Synthetic Na_{v}1.4 blockers ===
- Cannabidiol
- Carbamazepine
- Flecainide
- Lacosamide
- Lamotrigine
- Lubeluzole
- Methocarbamol
- Mexiletine
- Phenytoin
- Propafenone
- Ranolazine
- Riluzole
- Rufinamide
- Safinamide
- Tocainide
