= DM2 =

DM2 may refer to:

- Despicable Me 2, a 2013 film
- Diabetes mellitus type 2
- Dystrophia myotonica type 2
- Doxorubicin
- SpaceX Demonstration Mission 2
