= CDC42BPA =

Protein-coding gene in humans

Identifiers
- Aliases: CDC42BPA, MRCK, MRCKA, PK428, CDC42 binding protein kinase alpha
- External IDs: OMIM: 603412; MGI: 2441841; GeneCards: CDC42BPA
Enzyme activity
EC #	BRENDA	ExPASy	KEGG	MetaCyc
2.7.11.1	↗	↗	↗	↗

Gene location (Human)
Chr.	Chromosome 1 (human)
Band	1q42.13	Start	226,989,865 bp
Band	1q42.13	End	227,318,492 bp

Gene location (Mouse)
Chr.	Chromosome 1 (mouse)
Band	1|1 H4	Start	179,788,037 bp
Band	1|1 H4	End	179,993,168 bp
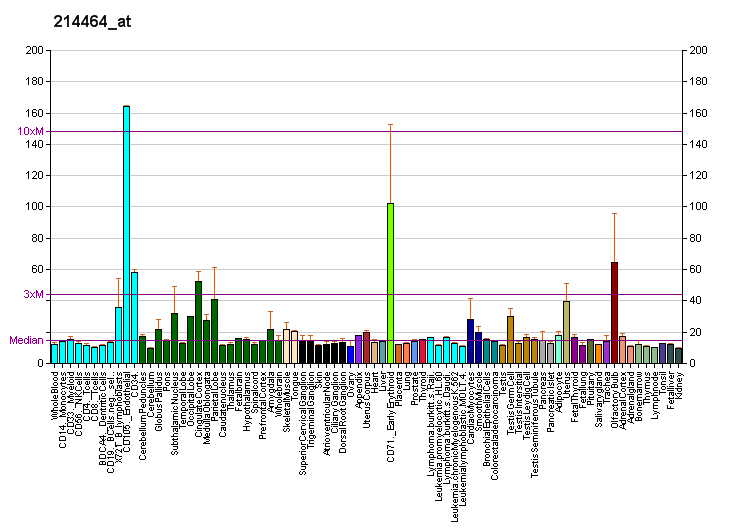

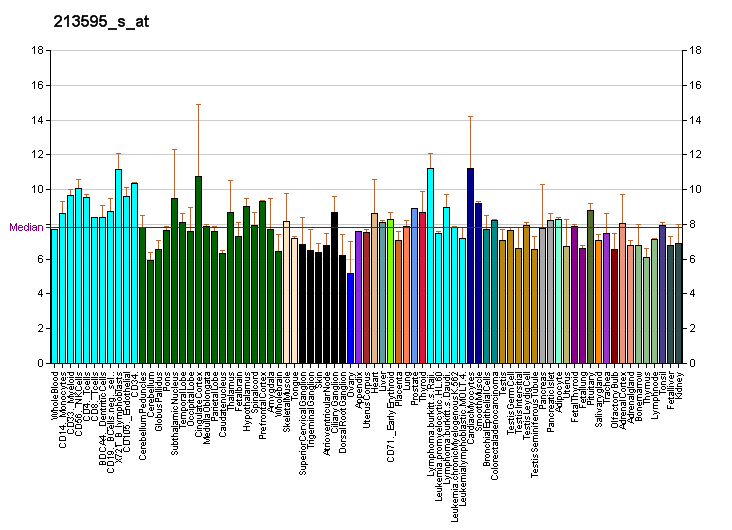

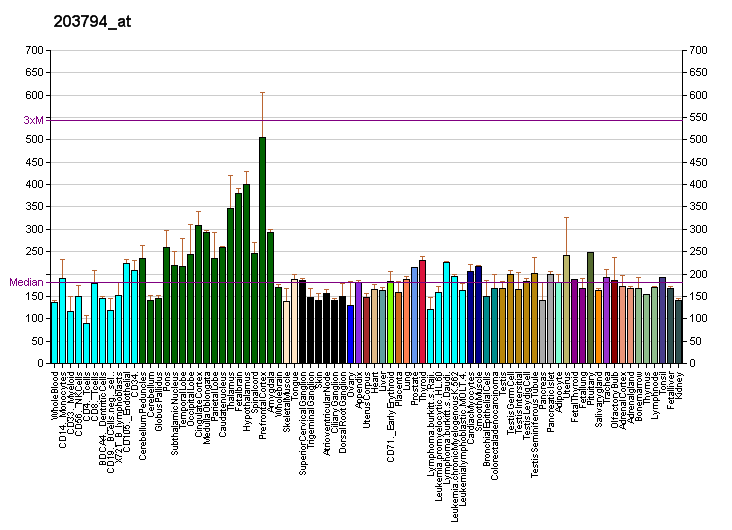
RNA expression pattern
Bgee	Human / Mouse (ortholog); Top expressed in: internal globus pallidus; pylorus; tibia; lateral nuclear group of thalamus; secondary oocyte; external globus pallidus; pars reticulata; renal medulla; Brodmann area 23; corpus callosum / Top expressed in: zygote; superior frontal gyrus; primary visual cortex; cerebellar cortex; dentate gyrus of hippocampal formation granule cell; genital tubercle; central gray substance of midbrain; neural layer of retina; medial geniculate nucleus; nucleus of stria terminalis; More reference expression data
BioGPS	More reference expression data
Gene ontology
Molecular function	transferase activity; nucleotide binding; protein serine/threonine kinase activity; protein kinase activity; protein binding; ATP binding; magnesium ion binding; metal ion binding; identical protein binding; kinase activity
Cellular component	cytoplasm; actomyosin; extracellular exosome; cell leading edge; cell-cell junction; lamellipodium; cell projection; cytoskeleton
Biological process	protein phosphorylation; actomyosin structure organization; intracellular signal transduction; cell migration; phosphorylation; actin cytoskeleton reorganization; actin cytoskeleton organization; peptidyl-threonine phosphorylation
Sources:Amigo / QuickGO
Orthologs
Databases	NCBI: entry; OMA: entry
Species	Human	Mouse
Entrez	8476	226751
Ensembl	ENSG00000143776	ENSMUSG00000026490
UniProt	Q5VT25	Q3UU96
RefSeq (mRNA)	NM_003607; NM_014826; NM_001366010; NM_001366011; NM_001366019 NM_001387550; NM_001394014	NM_001033285; NM_001346804; NM_001346805; NM_001359541; NM_001359542 NM_001359543; NM_001359544; NM_001359545; NM_001359546; NM_001359547; NM_001359548; NM_001359549
RefSeq (protein)	NP_003598; NP_055641; NP_001352939; NP_001352940; NP_001352948	NP_001028457; NP_001333733; NP_001333734; NP_001346470; NP_001346471 NP_001346472; NP_001346473; NP_001346474; NP_001346475; NP_001346476; NP_001346477; NP_001346478
Location (UCSC)	Chr 1: 226.99 – 227.32 Mb	Chr 1: 179.79 – 179.99 Mb
PubMed search
- Wikidata
View/Edit Human	View/Edit Mouse

Serine/threonine-protein kinase MRCK alpha is an enzyme that in humans is encoded by the CDC42BPA gene.

The protein encoded by this gene is a member of the Serine/Threonine protein kinase family. This kinase contains multiple functional domains. Its kinase domain is highly similar to that of the myotonic dystrophy protein kinase (DMPK). This kinase also contains a Rac interactive binding (CRIB) domain, and has been shown to bind CDC42. It may function as a CDC42 downstream effector mediating CDC42 induced peripheral actin formation, and promoting cytoskeletal reorganization. Multiple alternatively spliced transcript variants have been described, and the full-length nature of two of them has been reported.
