= Fainting goat =

American breed of meat goat

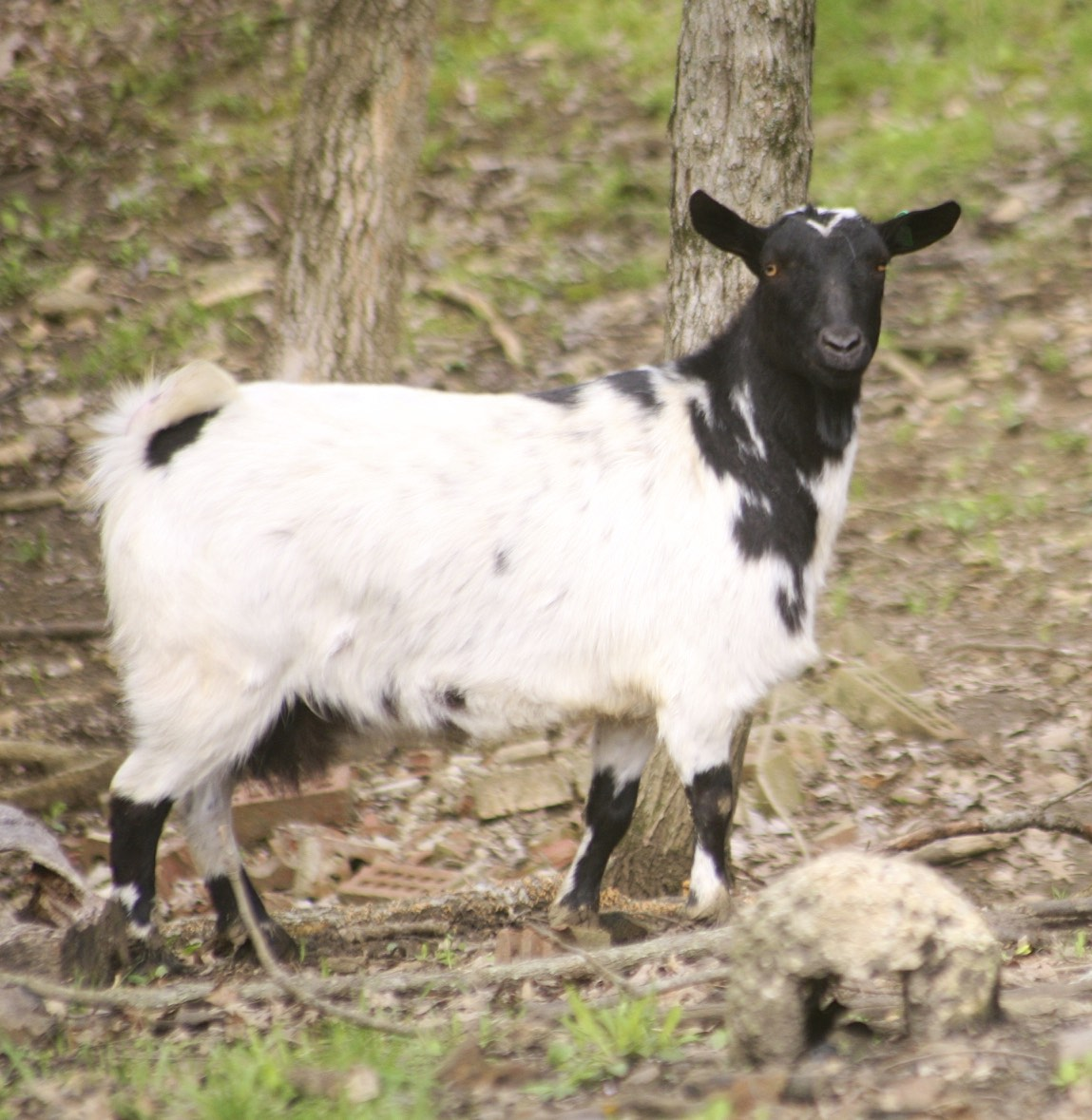
Myotonic doe

The fainting goat or myotonic goat is an American breed of goat. It may also be known as the Tennessee fainting goat, falling goat, stiff-legged goat, nervous goat, or as the Tennessee wooden-leg goat. The fainting goat is characterized by myotonia congenita, a hereditary condition that may cause it to stiffen or fall over when excited or startled. Four goats of this type were first brought to Tennessee in the 1880s.

== History ==
Fainting goats were first brought to Marshall County, Tennessee, in the 1880s. Existing breeds of myotonic goats seem to have originated from a limited number of goats in Tennessee in the 1880s. White and Plaskett reported seeing these goats in five counties in Tennessee: Marshall, Giles, Lawrence, Maury, and Coffee. There were also goats in Texas that were brought over from Giles County in Tennessee, solely for a farmer who claimed to know of the goats' existence to prove it as fact to his neighbors. The goats were unable to jump over normal-sized fences, and found holes in the ground to crawl underneath the fences, similar to pigs. This unusual behavior made the goats more desirable in this era, as many farmers used stone walls for fences, therefore containing their goats. In Marshall County, there was also a buck goat brought over from Canada.

The A. & M. College in Texas owned a zoo during 1926–1927 in which a myotonic goat was presented. Dr White stated that in the summer of 1929 in Egypt, he witnessed several fainting goats between the Suez Canal and the border of Palestine. He also stated that he shipped some of the goats from Tennessee to a professor by the name of Nagel, at the Nervous Disease Institute in Germany for studies.

The fainting was first described in scientific literature in 1904 and described as a "congenital myotonia" in 1939. The mutation in the goat gene that causes this muscle stiffness was discovered in 1996, several years after the equivalent gene had been discovered in humans and mice. The tendency of goats to spasm has been attested as early as the Hippocratic Corpus, where analogies are drawn from the phenomenon to human illness.

The experiments of Brown and Harvey in 1939 with the myotonic goat made a major contribution to the understanding of the physiological basis of this condition and influenced many other theories of myotonia and its causes. The myotonic goat is important in history for researching and clarifying the role of chloride in muscle excitation.

== Characteristics ==
Myotonic goats vary heavily in their characteristics in comparison to other goat breeds, and they possess certain traits that other goat breeds do not. Distinctly, their head and body formation tends to be different.

Myotonic goats have a wide body and a heavier mass. The muscle condition of the myotonic goats usually leads to an increased muscle mass with a broader build. Slightly smaller than standard goat breeds, fainting goats are generally 43 cm (17 in) to 64 cm (25 in) tall and can weigh anywhere from 27 kg (60 lb) to 79 kg (174 lb). Males - called billies or bucks - can be as heavy as 90 kg (200 lb). Broadness is shown throughout the back and shoulders due to muscle density.

Myotonic goats have large, prominent eyes in high sockets that tend to protrude and are fairly distinct features. They are sometimes called "bug-eyed" for this feature. The heads tend to be medium length with a broad muzzle. Jaws tend to be broad as well, and distinct. The face is usually straight or convex. The ears tend to be normal-sized and closer to the face. The ears also exhibit a ripple halfway down the length of the ear. The horns tend to run large and have 1–2 inches (25–51 mm) between. The neck tends to be muscle dense and more round than that of dairy breeds. The skin on many males' necks is wrinkled and thick. The neck can also run horizontally and, therefore, the head can be lower.

Their hair can be short or long, with certain individuals producing a great deal of cashmere during colder months. Coats can demonstrate any color or pattern.

Myotonic goats are vigilant animals that are quieter than other goat breeds. Other important differential characteristics of the myotonic goat include their high trainability, stiffness, high quality adaptation to low-input farm land and foraging, and cross-breeding creating hybrids leading to physical strength and good health.

== Cause of "fainting" ==
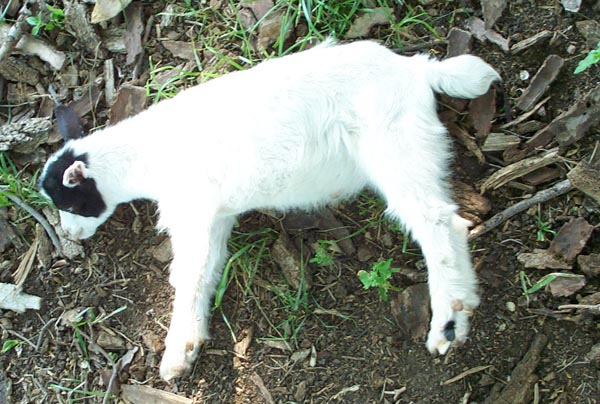
A fainting goat kid in the midst of a myotonic "fainting" spell.

Myotonia congenita is caused by an inherited disorder of a chloride channel in the muscles of the skeleton (skeletal muscle chloride channel 1, CLCN1). Congenital myotonia can be inherited as an autosomal dominant trait (with incomplete penetrance) or a recessive trait, resulting in the varying severity of the condition. In affected goats, the CLCN1 gene contains a missense mutation; the amino acid alanine is replaced with a proline residue. This small change causes the chloride channel in the muscle fibres to have a reduced conductance of chloride ions. This missense mutation occurs in a sequence of seven amino acids that are included in a group of closely related channels including that of humans and rats.

From the study above, it was found that a change in the nucleotide sequence caused a proline substitution for alanine residue in the carboxyl terminus of the goat's chloride channel. A goat demonstrating the disease had a +47 mV shift in the channel activation, which created less open chloride channels located near the rested membrane of the skeletal muscles, which demonstrates a molecular basis-decreased chloride production in the myotonic muscles.

The mutation causes a delay in the relaxation of the muscles after the goat has made an involuntary movement. After stimulation, in myotonia congenita there is an increased tendency of the muscle fibers to respond with repetitive action potentials and after discharges. It has been shown that the increased muscle excitability is largely accounted for by the lack of chloride permeability in these fibers. Myotonia congenita is also characterized by a significant increase in the fast isomyosins in each muscle type. The muscle fibers of the myotonic goat were found to be highly (electrically) resistive, corresponding to the blocking of chloride conductance. In a study, normal goat muscle fibers could be made myotonic by blocking the chloride conductance using myotonia-inducing drugs, or by substituting in an anion that is unable to pass through a semi-permeable membrane.

Isolated intercostal muscle from goats with the condition was shown to be significantly different from that of normal goats in terms of the temperature dependence of the resting membrane resistance and potassium efflux. These differences help to explain increases in the severity of myotonia in the whole animal that occurs upon decreasing the temperature of the involved muscles.

It has been observed that there are no abnormalities in percussion responses or stiffness during the first 14 days of a newborn goat's life. The first percussion responses were observed during days 18–143, and the stiffening and/or falling begins to occur during days 20–173.

Although there is no known treatment for myotonia congenita, in a study testing the effect of hydration on myotonia in goats, it was found that upon depriving goats of water, the myotonic symptoms disappeared within 3 days and returned fully within 2–3 days of water being provided. Previous studies have also reported that taurine, an amino sulphonic acid, when given to myotonic patients can reduce the symptoms of the condition. However, it has been shown that it neither antagonizes the condition, nor prevents it.

== Relationship to humans ==
The condition in myotonic goats is similar to a condition in humans that is known as congenital myotonia. As with goats, humans are typically not consumed by the condition and can more or less lead normal lives. Similar to goats, in humans the condition is described as a chloride channel disorder known for delayed muscle relaxation, is also caused by mutations in the skeletal muscle chloride channel gene, and can range from mild to severe. In an experiment with humans using muscle biopsy, after Periodic acid-Schiff (PAS) staining with diastase digestion, there was PAS positive material within myotonic goat fibers.

Myotonic goats tend to be less preferred for sustainable meat production. Meat production from goats uses maternal breeds that demonstrate high levels of fitness under non-optimal situations. Myotonic goats' maternal fitness cannot be assessed with conventional methods. To estimate their maternal fitness, the health and reproductive traits of 80 myotonic goats were compared to those of Spanish goats, Kiko goats, and Boer goats. The study measured fecal egg count (FEC) and packed cell volume (PCV). Myotonic goats tended to have a lower body mass and a lower FEC, but a greater PCV than Boer goats. Weaning rates, annual kidding rates, doe retention rates and kid crop weaned were similar in all goats except myotonic goats, which had the lowest FEC compared to other breeds. This indicates that myotonic goats are less suited for meat production under non-optimal conditions.

In 2019, the myotonic goat's conservation status was listed as "at risk" in the DAD-IS database of the Food and Agriculture Organization of the United Nations. The Myotonic Goat Registry (MGR) believes it is important to maintain the breed, and that myotonic goats have other desirable traits than their "fainting" behavior. The MGR states that these traits include quiet behavior, parasite resistance, good mothering ability, and for the observation of their fainting behavior. Myotonic goats tend not to jump over fences higher than 0.5 m (1 ft 8 in). This allows farmers to have less vertical fencing compared with other goats. The MGR also registers percentage Myotonic goats in an attempt to ensure an accurate registry. This allows for identification of purebred myotonic goats which may be used for meat, milk, or pets.
