= Hans Gustav Wilhelm Steinert =

German neurologist

Hans Gustav Wilhem Steinert
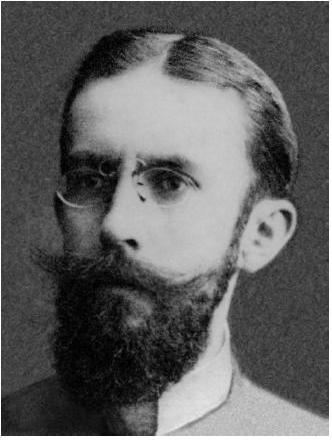
- Born: 10 April 1875; Dresden, German Empire
- Died: 3 November 1911 (aged 36); Leipzig, German Empire
- Known for: Describing Myotonic dystrophy (Steinert syndrome)
- Scientific career
- Fields: Neurology
- Workplaces: Leipzig University Hospital

Hans Gustav Wilhelm Steinert (10 April 1875 – 3 November 1911) was a German neurologist best known for publishing the first description of myotonic dystrophy.

== Early life and career ==
Steinert was born in Dresden to Otto Steinert, a lawyer, and his wife Louise. From 1893 Steinert studied philosophy and medicine at the Universities of Leipzig, Freiburg, Berlin and Kiel, qualifying as a doctor in 1898.

He worked first as an assistant to Adolph Seeligmüller (1837–1912) in Halle, before working as a neurologist in Berlin under Emmanuel Mendel. Further employment included being an assistant to Franz Windscheid at the Leipzig pathology institute, and to Alfred Fiedler at the Dresden city hospital. Following this, he worked as first assistant to Heinrich Curschmann (1846–1910) at the Leipzig university hospital, being promoted to assistant professor in 1910.

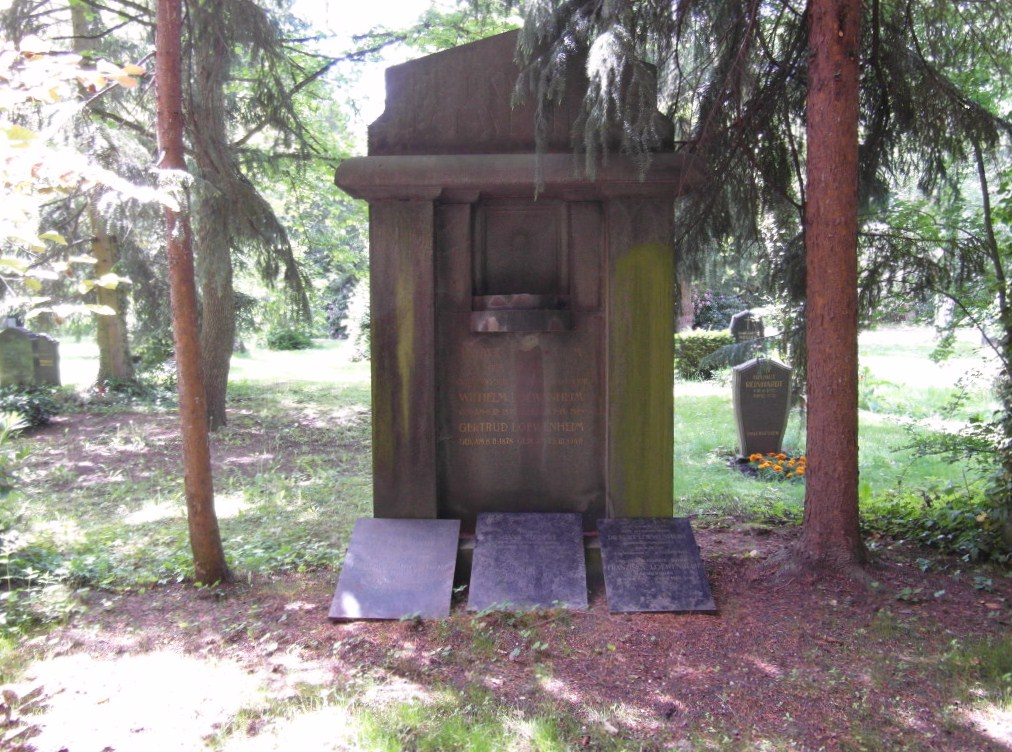
Tomb of Hans Steinert and members of the Löwenheim family

Whilst working for Curschmann, in 1909 Steinert published a description of six patients with a neurological disorder that became known as myotonic dystrophy. He continued this work by collating reports of similar cases made by others. Stimulating his patients' muscles with electricity, he observed worm-like twitching reactions, later identified as myotonic discharges with delayed relaxation. After performing an autopsy on one of his patients, he was the first to describe the pathological changes associated with the condition - lipid accumulation and fibrosis of the skeletal muscles without any obvious changes to the peripheral nerves. Further work in this field was performed by Curschmann's son, Hans Curschmann (1875–1950). In recognition of their work, myotonic dystrophy is sometimes referred to as Curschmann-Steinert syndrome.

== Personal life and death ==
In 1905 he married Else Loewenheim (1879–1948), one of the first female German ophthalmologists, with whom he had two daughters (born 1906 and 1908) and a son (born 1910).

Steinert died on 3 November 1911 in Leipzig from an adrenal carcinoma.
