= Peter Emil Becker =

German neurologist, psychiatrist and geneticist (1908–2000)

- Born: 23 November 1908
- Died: 7 October 2000 (aged 91)
- Education: Marburg, Berlin, Munich, Vienna, Hamburg, Freiburg
- Known for: Becker's muscular dystrophy and Becker myotonia
- Scientific career
- Fields: Neurology, psychiatry, genetics
- Workplaces: University of Freiburg; Kaiser Wilhelm Institute of Anthropology, Human Heredity, and Eugenics, Berlin; University of Göttingen
- Academic advisors: Eugen Fischer

Notes
- Member of the SA (Sturmabteilung) from 1934; Nazi Party from 1940.

Peter Emil Becker (23 November 1908 – 7 October 2000) was a German neurologist, psychiatrist and geneticist. He is remembered for his studies of muscular dystrophies. Becker's muscular dystrophy (OMIM 300376) and Becker myotonia (OMIM 255700) are named after him. Since 1998, the Gesellschaft für Neuropädiatrie (GNP) grants Peter-Emil-Becker-Preis for special achievements in the field of child neurology.

He studied medicine in Marburg, Berlin, Munich, Vienna and Hamburg, graduating in 1933. Afterwards he trained in neurology and psychiatry in Hamburg and Freiburg. Between 1934 and 1936 he was attached to the Kaiser Wilhelm Institute of Anthropology, Human Heredity, and Eugenics (KWI-A), working under the guidance of Eugen Fischer. While at the KWI-A, Becker also worked with the prominent geneticist, eugenics specialist, and Nazi Party member Dr. Fritz Lenz.

Becker was a member of the SA (Sturmabteilung) since 1934, and in 1940 he joined the Nazi Party. After the war he was dismissed from the University of Freiburg because of the membership in these organisations; however, in 1947 he was formally de-Nazified and has obtained venia legendi at the University of Freiburg. In 1957 he was appointed professor of human genetics at the University of Göttingen, the post he held until his retirement in 1975.
