= Myotonin-protein kinase =

Protein-coding gene in the species Homo sapiens

DMPK

Identifiers
- Aliases: DMPK, DM, DM1, DM1PK, DMK, MDPK, MT-PK, Dm15, dystrophia myotonica protein kinase, DM1 protein kinase
- External IDs: OMIM: 605377; MGI: 94906; GeneCards: DMPK
Available structures
PDB	Ortholog search: PDBe RCSB
PDB	List of PDB id codes 1WT6, 2VD5
Enzyme activity
EC #	BRENDA	ExPASy	KEGG	MetaCyc
2.7.11.1	↗	↗	↗	↗

Gene location (Human)
Chr.	Chromosome 19 (human)
Band	19q13.32	Start	45,769,709 bp
Band	19q13.32	End	45,782,552 bp

Gene location (Mouse)
Chr.	Chromosome 7 (mouse)
Band	7 A3|7 9.46 cM	Start	18,817,774 bp
Band	7 A3|7 9.46 cM	End	18,827,746 bp
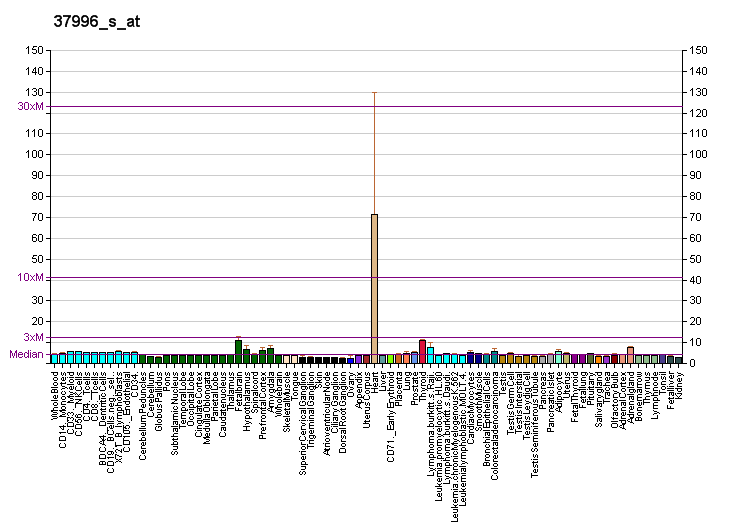

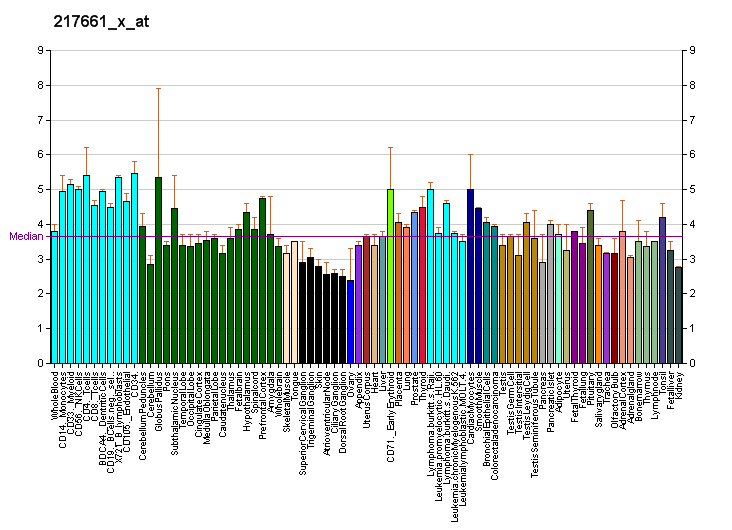

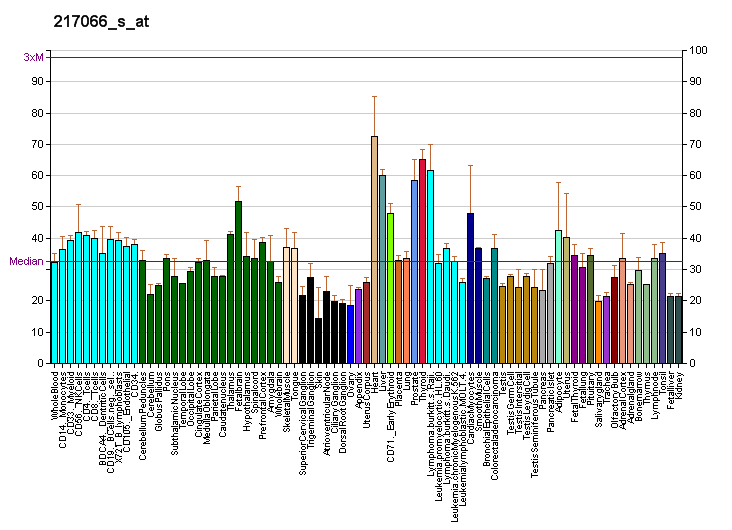
RNA expression pattern
Bgee	Human / Mouse (ortholog); Top expressed in: apex of heart; right coronary artery; gastric mucosa; popliteal artery; tibial arteries; right auricle of heart; ascending aorta; Descending thoracic aorta; left uterine tube; body of uterus / Top expressed in: myocardium of ventricle; muscle of thigh; cardiac muscle tissue of left ventricle; lip; skeletal muscle tissue; extraocular muscle; interventricular septum; soleus muscle; ascending aorta; esophagus; More reference expression data
BioGPS	More reference expression data
Gene ontology
Molecular function	protein serine/threonine kinase activity; ATP binding; myosin phosphatase regulator activity; protein kinase activity; protein binding; kinase activity; metal ion binding; nucleotide binding; transferase activity; heat shock protein binding
Cellular component	integral component of membrane; mitochondrial outer membrane; nucleus; sarcoplasmic reticulum; sarcoplasmic reticulum membrane; cytosol; membrane; endoplasmic reticulum; mitochondrial membranes; plasma membrane; cytoplasm; nuclear outer membrane; endoplasmic reticulum membrane; mitochondrion; integral component of mitochondrial outer membrane; nuclear membrane
Biological process	regulation of myotube differentiation; muscle cell apoptotic process; protein phosphorylation; peptidyl-serine phosphorylation; regulation of cardiac conduction; regulation of sodium ion transport; regulation of skeletal muscle contraction by calcium ion signaling; nuclear envelope organization; regulation of excitatory postsynaptic membrane potential involved in skeletal muscle contraction; regulation of synapse structural plasticity; phosphorylation; cellular calcium ion homeostasis; regulation of heart contraction; regulation of phosphoprotein phosphatase activity; intracellular signal transduction
Sources:Amigo / QuickGO
Orthologs
Databases	NCBI: entry; OMA: entry
Species	Human	Mouse
Entrez	1760	13400
Ensembl	ENSG00000104936	ENSMUSG00000030409
UniProt	Q09013	P54265
RefSeq (mRNA)	NM_001081560; NM_001081562; NM_001081563; NM_001288764; NM_001288765 NM_001288766; NM_004409	NM_001190490; NM_001190491; NM_032418; NM_001374651; NM_001379257
RefSeq (protein)	NP_001075029; NP_001075031; NP_001075032; NP_001275693; NP_001275694 NP_001275695; NP_004400; NP_001275693.1; NP_001275694.1; NP_001275695.1	NP_001177419; NP_001177420; NP_115794; NP_001361580; NP_001366186
Location (UCSC)	Chr 19: 45.77 – 45.78 Mb	Chr 7: 18.82 – 18.83 Mb
PubMed search
- Wikidata
View/Edit Human	View/Edit Mouse

Myotonin-protein kinase (MT-PK) also known as myotonic dystrophy protein kinase (MDPK) or dystrophia myotonica protein kinase (DMPK) is an enzyme that in humans is encoded by the DMPK gene.

The DMPK gene product is a Ser/Thr protein kinase homologous to the MRCK p21-activated kinases and Rho kinase family. Data obtained by using antibodies that detect specific isoforms of DMPK indicate that the most abundant isoform of DMPK is an 80-kDa protein expressed almost exclusively in smooth, skeletal, and cardiac muscles. This kinase exists both as a membrane-associated and as a soluble form in human left ventricular samples. The different C termini of DMPK that arise from alternative splicing determine its localization to the endoplasmic reticulum, mitochondria, or cytosol in transfected COS-1 cells. Among the substrates for DMPK proposed by in vitro studies are phospholemman, the dihydropyridine receptor, and the myosin phosphatase targeting subunit. However, an in vivo demonstration of the phosphorylation of these substrates by DMPK remains to be established, and a link between these substrates and the clinical manifestations of myotonic dystrophy (DM) is unclear.

== Function ==
Myotonin-protein kinase is a serine-threonine kinase that is closely related to other kinases that interact with members of the Rho family of small GTPases. Substrates for this enzyme include myogenin, the beta-subunit of the L-type calcium channels, and phospholemman. Although the specific function of this protein is unknown, it appears to play an important role in muscle, heart, and brain cells. This protein may be involved in communication within cells. It also appears to regulate the production and function of important structures inside muscle cells by interacting with other proteins. For example, myotonic dystrophy protein kinase has been shown to turn off (inhibit) part of a muscle protein called myosin phosphatase. Myosin phosphatase is an enzyme that plays a role in muscle tensing (contraction) and relaxation.

== Structure ==
Dystrophia myotonica protein kinase (DMPK) is a serine/threonine kinase composed of a kinase domain and a coiled-coil domain involved in the multimerization. The crystal structure of the kinase domain of DMPK bound to the inhibitor bisindolylmaleimide VIII (BIM-8) revealed a dimeric enzyme associated by a conserved dimerization domain. The affinity of dimerisation suggested that the kinase domain alone is insufficient for dimerisation in vivo and that the coiled-coil domains are required for stable dimer formation. The kinase domain is in an active conformation, with a fully ordered and correctly positioned aC helix, and catalytic residues in a conformation competent for catalysis. The conserved hydrophobic motif at the C-terminal extension of the kinase domain is bound to the N-terminal lobe of the kinase domain, despite being unphosphorylated.

== Clinical significance ==
The 3' untranslated region of this gene contains 5-37 copies of a CTG trinucleotide repeat. Expansion of this unstable motif to 50-5,000 copies causes myotonic dystrophy type I, which increases in severity with increasing repeat element copy number. Repeat expansion is associated with condensation of local chromatin structure that disrupts the expression of genes in this region. As the DMPK repeat is replicated, the hairpin loop that is formed leads to repeat expansion (a) or contractions (b).

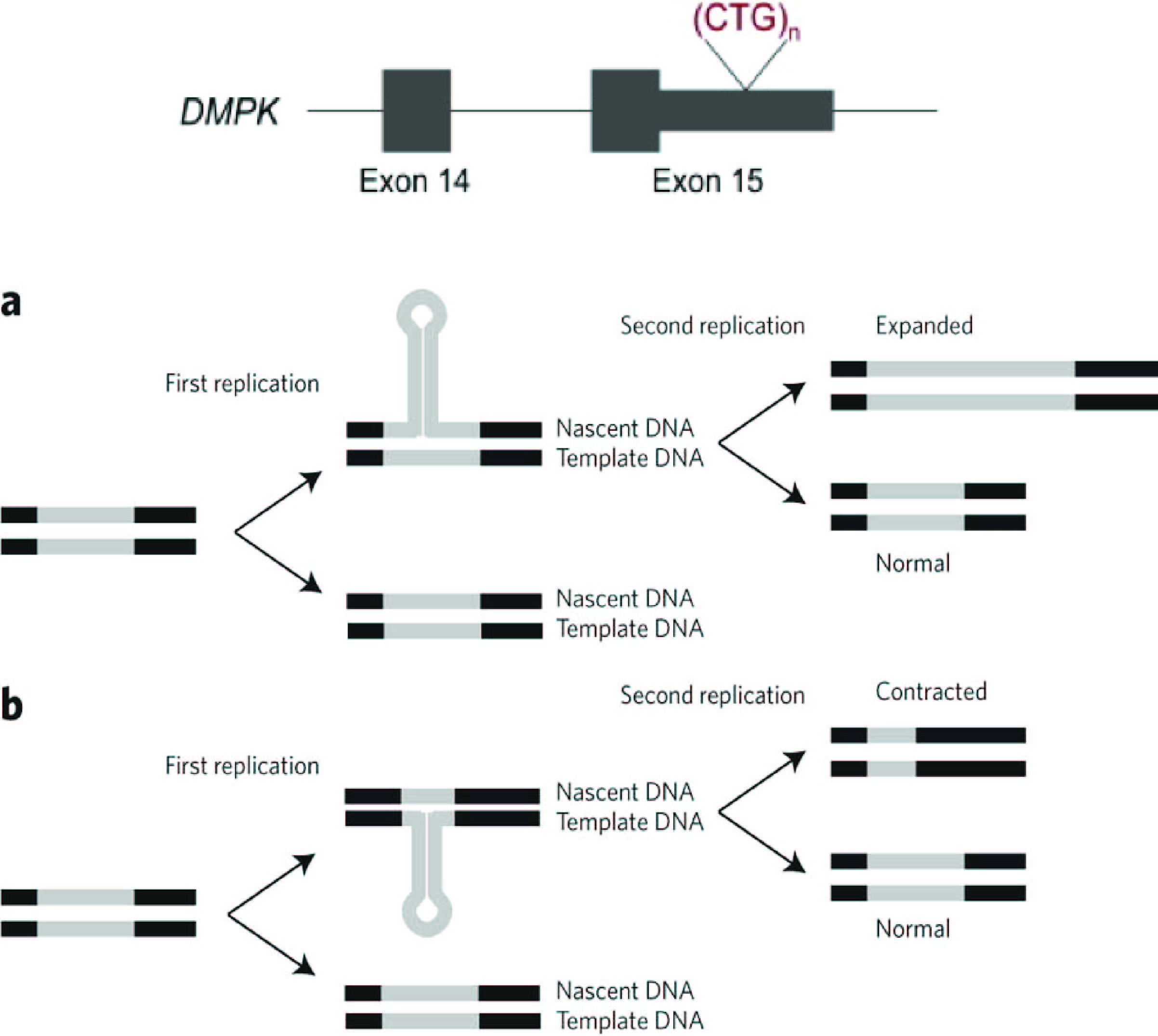
CTG repeats are located in the 3' UTR of the DMPK gene. Through formation of hairpin loops, the repeats are contracted or expanded.

Myotonic dystrophy (DM) 1 is an autosomal dominant neuromuscular disorder affecting approximately 1 in 8000 individuals. Affected individuals display a wide range of symptoms including myotonia, skeletal muscle weakness and wasting, cardiac conduction abnormalities, and cataracts. Despite cloning of the locus, the complex disease phenotype of DM has proven difficult to interpret, and the exact role of DMPK in the pathogenesis of DM remains unclear.

== Interactions ==
Myotonic dystrophy protein kinase has been shown to interact with HSPB2 and RAC1.

== Regulation ==
The close relationship of DMPK to the Rho-kinases has led to speculation whether DMPK activity may be regulated in vivo by small G proteins, particularly of the Rho family. Although DMPK lacks obvious binding sites for known G, DMPK-1 oligomers exhibit low basal catalytic activity due to the presence of the C-terminal autoinhibitory domain (AI). A protease (P) within the membrane cleaves DMPK-1, removing the C-terminal autoinhibitory and membrane association domains and releasing cytosolic, basally active DMPK-2. This processing event would produce longterm activation of the kinase. Short-term activation of DMPK-1 and -2 may be mediated by transitory interaction with a small GTPase (G).

A general model that accounts for DMPK oligomerization, processing, and regulation has been proposed. In this model, transient activation of kinase activity would occur in response to G protein second messengers, while longterm activation of DMPK could be mediated by a membrane associated protease that cleaves DMPK-1 to release cytosolic DMPK-2 in a persistently activated form. The persistent activation of serine/threonine kinases has been shown to play a role in the determination of cell fate as well as memory production in the nervous system. In this respect, DMPK may be similar to PKA and PKC, two kinases that can be transiently activated in response to second messengers or persistently activated by proteolytic removal of an autoinhibitory domain. Thus, this model suggests that the two endogenous DMPK forms may possess different activities, localizations, regulators, and substrates and perform distinct physiological functions.
