= Schwartz–Jampel syndrome =

Rare genetic condition of muscle and cartilage

- Other names: Chondrodystrophic myotonia
- Schwartz–Jampel syndrome is inherited in an autosomal recessive manner.
- Specialty: Orthopedic

Schwartz–Jampel syndrome (SJS, also known as chondrodystrophic myotonia) is a rare genetic disease caused by a mutation in the perlecan gene (HSPG2) which causes osteochondrodysplasia associated with myotonia. Most people with Schwartz–Jampel syndrome have a nearly normal life expectancy.

== Cause ==
Schwartz–Jampel syndrome is caused by mutations in the HSPG2 gene, which makes the protein perlecan, which is found in muscle and cartilage. Relationships between the disease and perlecan deficiency have been studied. In Schwartz–Jampel syndrome, it is suspected that abnormal perlecan function leads to a deficiency in acetylcholinesterase, an enzyme involved in breaking down the neurotransmitter acetylcholine, which incites muscle contraction. If acetylcholine is not broken down, it can lead to prolonged muscle contraction/stiffening of the muscles (myotonia). The condition is believed to follow an autosomal recessive inheritance pattern, although some reported cases suggest an autosomal dominant inheritance pattern.

== Symptoms ==
Some signs and symptoms that are frequently exhibited in patients with SJS include epiphyseal abnormalities, metaphyseal abnormalities, arthrogryposis multiplex congenita, bowing of long bones, a protruding lower lip, full cheeks, a disturbed gait, genu valgum, hip dysplasia, hypertonia, intellectual disability, joint stiffness, low-set posteriorly-rotated ears, metatarsus valgus, micromelia, myotonia, narrow mouth, flat foot, pursed lips, short stature, skeletal dysplasia, trismus, and visual impairment.

== Diagnosis ==
Schwartz–Jampel syndrome is diagnosed on the basis of characteristic facial features, skeletal features and myotonia. Blood tests may show elevated serum creatine kinase or aldolase. X-rays, muscle biopsy or electromyography (EMG) may be useful. Genetic testing for the HSPG2 gene may confirm diagnosis.

== Treatment ==
There is no cure for Schwartz–Jampel syndrome. Treatment is aimed at reducing muscle stiffness and cramping and may include massage, muscle warming and gradual strengthening exercises. Muscle relaxants or anti-seizure medications, especially carbamazepine, may be used. Eye symptoms such as blepharospasm might be relieved by Botox. Otherwise, a variety of surgical procedures have been found to be effective. Malignant hyperthermia, a potential complication of surgery, is a greater risk for people Schwartz–Jampel syndrome and an important consideration when considering surgery.

== Prognosis ==
Most people with Schwartz–Jampel syndrome have a nearly normal life expectancy.

== History ==
The syndrome was first described in 1962 by American ophthalmologist Oscar Schwartz and American neuro-ophthalmologist Robert Steven Jampel.

== Society ==
In March 2013, there was media coverage of a British 7-year-old boy named Owen, with chronically tense muscles due to SJS, and his three-legged pet dog. They became first-place winners of the 2013 Crufts Kennel Club's annual Friends for Life competition, which "celebrates dogs that have truly earned the title of man’s best friend through bravery, support or companionship". The dog was also awarded The Braveheart Honour in the ceremony of The British Animal Honours in April 2013 (Haatchi the dog). The two are featured in the book Haatchi & Little B (2014, ISBN 125-006-936-X) by Wendy Holden and on Haatchi's Facebook page. In 2016, 9-year-old Owen was featured in a TLC documentary series, Two in a Million, in which he met and formed a friendship with Giovanni, a 7-year-old American boy with SJS.
