= VDE e.V. =

German technical-scientific association

Verband der Elektrotechnik, Elektronik und Informationstechnik e.V. (VDE)
- Founded: January 21, 1893
- Type: Technical-scientific association
- Purpose: Electrical, electronics, and information technology
- Headquarters: Frankfurt
- Region served: Germany
- Method: Industry standards, conferences, publications
- Members: 36,000
- Key people: Alf Henryk Wulf, President; Ansgar Hinz, CEO
- Employees: 1,600
- Website: www.vde.com

The VDE e. V. (German: Verband der Elektrotechnik, Elektronik und Informationstechnik) is a German technical-scientific association. VDE is best known for creating and maintaining standards in the field of electric safety and has a strong influence on the DIN (German Institute for Standardization).

== Organization ==
VDE has about 36,000 members (including 1,300 companies), according to its own statements and is one of the largest technical and scientific associations in Europe. The VDE is headquartered in Frankfurt am Main and has main branches in Brussels and Berlin. The president of VDE is the former Alcatel and Alstom Power manager Alf Henryk Wulf.

VDE carries out standardization work, product testing and certification. VDE is involved in technical knowledge transfers, research and promoting young talents in the technologies of electrical engineering, electronics and information technology and their applications. Other VDE activities include ensuring safety in electrical engineering, developing recognized technical regulations as national and international standards as well as testing and certifying electrical and electronic devices and systems. VDE works in the fields of information technology, energy, medical engineering, microelectronics, micro and nanotechnology and automation.

== History ==
The first electrotechnical association in the territory of the then German Empire had existed since 1879. On January 21 and 22, 1893, 37 delegates from various German-speaking electrical engineering associations founded the VDE in Berlin. The first technical committee of the VDE was formed at the first annual meeting. Their task was to draw up regulations for electrical systems. As a result, the first “VDE regulation”, "VDE 0100", was passed in 1895 for the safe creation of electrotechnical systems.

In 1937 the VDE was incorporated into the NS-Bund Deutscher Technik. This was subordinate to the main office for technology in the NSDAP (Hauptamt für Technik in der NSDAP). After World War II, the standardization work of the VDE was initially continued in the British sector of Berlin by a trustee. In 1946, regional organizations of the VDE were re-established, and on March 23, 1950 the association was re-established in Frankfurt am Main.

== VDE’s technical societies ==
The Information Technology Society in the VDE (ITG) promotes research, development, and application of information technology in the data and communication technology, in production and communication systems, in environmental protection, medical and traffic technology.

Objectives of the Power Engineering Society in the VDE (ETG) are the interdisciplinary and international cooperation of industry, science, energy suppliers, and energy users.

The German Society for Biomedical Engineering in the VDE (DGBMT) is with more than 2,600 members the largest scientific technical society of medical technology in Germany. DGBMT promotes development of medical technology in Germany in a non-profit manner.

The aim of the interdisciplinary VDE/VDI Society of Microelectronics, Microsystems and Precision Engineering (GMM) is to give impulses in the fields of microelectronics, microsystems and nanotechnology as well as precision engineering and mechatronics in order to join forces in the processing of new fields and to promote the dialog between manufacturers, users, science, and politics.

The VDI/VDE Society for Measurement and Automatic Control (GMA) is the national network of experts for the promotion of the special fields of measurement and automatic control as well as optical technologies. The interdisciplinary orientation of GMA is increasingly characterized by the use of information processing and the use of open networks for automation tasks.

=== Standardization ===
The DKE German Commission for Electrical, Electronic & Information Technologies, a joint organization of the DIN (German Institute for Standardization) and the VDE, is the national organization responsible for creating and maintaining standards in these fields. Drawing on the expertise and work of about 5,500 voluntary professionals, the DKE represents Germany in the European and international bodies responsible for standardization.

The Forum Network Technology / Network Operation in the VDE (FNN) develops and disseminates VDE technical rules (VDE-Anwendungsregeln – “code of practice”) for the operation and safety of transmission and distribution networks as part of the VDE Specifications Code of Safety Standards. Moreover, the FNN gives guidance on the optimum use of resources to maximize safety, supply reliability, environmental friendliness and to achieve profitability. Members are companies, organizations, scientific institutions and public authorities.

=== Product testing and certification ===
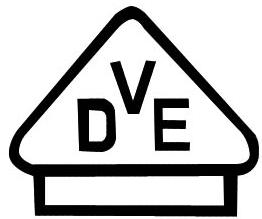
The VDE mark

The VDE mark (from the original name, Verband Deutscher Elektrotechniker) is meant to indicate safety and quality in electrical, information, and medical technologies. The VDE Testing and Certification Institute in Offenbach, Germany, tests roughly 100,000 products from over 10,000 customers worldwide. The spectrum of product tests covers safety, EMV, energy efficiency, and other product features, as well as certification and assembly inspections. The VDE Global Services GmbH provides local handling of all testing and certification procedures to its customers in Asia.

=== Publishing company ===
VDE Verlag GmbH, the association’s publisher with operations in Berlin and Offenbach, provides a full spectrum of literature on electrical engineering, electronics and information technology.

=== Technology Consulting ===
The VDI/VDE Innovation + Technik GmbH, headquartered in Berlin, is commissioned by German federal and state ministries to develop programs for promoting technical policies.

=== Promotion of young talent ===
The VDE Young Net supports and networks 14,000 students and young professionals across Germany. Every year, the VDE awards scholarships and attractive prizes to talented students, university graduates and young scientists.
