= German Commission for Electrotechnical, Electronic, and Information Technologies of DIN and VDE =

The German Commission for Electrotechnical, Electronic & Information Technologies of DIN and VDE (German: Deutsche Kommission Elektrotechnik Elektronik Informationstechnik im DIN und VDE), abbreviated DKE, is the German organisation responsible for the development and adoption of standards and safety specifications in the areas of electrical engineering, electronics and information technologies.

== Overview ==
DKE constitutes a joint organisation of DIN (the organisation for general standards in Germany) and VDE (a technical-scientific association), the juridical responsibility for running the DKE being in the hands of the VDE.

A standard may be first proposed by individual members of the VDE. Then when it has achieved national status the standard then becomes sanctioned by DKE. If further the standard is adopted at an international level, it can become an IEC standard.

== Membership ==
The DKE is the German member within European standardisation organisations such as CENELEC and ETSI, and international organisations such as International Electrotechnical Commission (IEC).
