= Myotonia =

Delayed relaxation of muscles following contraction

- Specialty: Neurology, neuromuscular medicine, medical genetics

Myotonia is a symptom of a small handful of certain neuromuscular disorders characterized by delayed relaxation (prolonged contraction) of the skeletal muscles after voluntary contraction or electrical stimulation, and the muscle shows an abnormal EMG.

Myotonia is the defining symptom of many channelopathies (diseases of ion channel transport) such as myotonia congenita, paramyotonia congenita and myotonic dystrophy.

Brody disease (a disease of ion pump transport) has symptoms similar to myotonia congenita, however, the delayed muscle relaxation is pseudo-myotonia as the EMG is normal. Other diseases that exhibit pseudo-myotonia are myositis, glycogen storage diseases, hyperkalemic periodic paralysis, root disease, anterior horn cell disorders, neuromyotonia, and Hoffmann syndrome.

Generally, repeated contraction of the muscle can alleviate the myotonia and relax the muscles thus improving the condition, however, this is not the case in paramyotonia congenita. This phenomenon is known as the "warm-up" reflex and is not to be confused with warming up before exercise, though they may appear similar. Individuals with the disorder may have trouble releasing their grip on objects or may have difficulty rising from a sitting position and a stiff, awkward gait.

Myotonia can affect all muscle groups; however, the pattern of affected muscles can vary depending on the specific disorder involved.

People with disorders involving myotonia can have life-threatening reactions to certain anaesthetics called anaesthesia-induced rhabdomyolysis.

== Causes ==
Myotonia may present in the following diseases, with different causes related to the ion channels in the skeletal muscle fiber membrane (sarcolemma).

=== Myotonic dystrophy ===
Two documented types, DM1 and DM2 exist. In myotonic dystrophy a nucleotide expansion of either of two genes, related to type of disease, results in failure of correct expression (splicing of the mRNA) of the ClC-1 ion channel, due to accumulation of RNA in the cytosol of the cell. The ClC-1 ion channel is responsible for the major part of chloride conductance in the skeletal muscle cell, and lack of sufficient chloride conductance may result in myotonia, (see myotonia congenita). When the splicing of the mRNA was corrected in vitro, ClC-1 channel function was greatly improved and myotonia was abolished.

=== Myotonia congenita ===
(Congenital myotonia) of which two types called Becker's disease and Thomsen's disease exist. Both diseases are caused by mutations in the gene CLCN1 encoding the ClC-1 ion channel. More than 130 different mutations exist in total, and a large phenotypic variation is therefore present in this disease. The mutations are loss-of-function mutations that render the ClC-1 ion channel dysfunctional to varying degrees, with reduced chloride conductance as a result. Reduced chloride conductance may result in myotonia, due to accumulation of potassium in the transverse-tubules in skeletal muscle (see myotonia congenita). This is the same genetic disease that makes certain strains of North American goats faint when scared.

Symptoms of myotonia (documented in myotonia congenita) are more frequently experienced in women during pregnancy.

Myotonia could be caused by genetic mutations in the SCN4A gene that encodes the skeletal muscle sodium channel subtype 4 (Nav1.4). Some studies have suggested that changes in physiological pH could have modulatory effects on Nav1.4 sodium channels, which could have manifestations in myotonic phenotypes.

=== Paramyotonia congenita ===
This disease results from mutation in the SCN4A gene encoding the voltage-gated sodium channel Na_{v}1.4 in skeletal muscle fiber membrane. Mutations may alter the kinetics of the channel, such that the channel fails to inactivate properly, thus allowing spontaneous action potentials to occur after voluntary activity has terminated, prolonging relaxation of the muscle, or can result in paralysis if the relaxation is severely prolonged (see SCN4A). This inability of muscles to relax worsening with exercise is often termed "paradoxical myotonia." Paramyotonia also frequently triggered by exercise, cold, and potassium.

=== Potassium-aggravated myotonia ===
Potassium-aggravated myotonia (PAM) results from in a mututation of the SCN4A gene that causes skeletal muscles to be unable to relax after contracting in bouts, typically following the consumption of potassium rich food. It is debated if potassium-aggravated myotonia is a distinct disease from Paramyotonia Congenita, and recent academic papers have classified it both ways.

=== Hyperkalemic periodic paralysis ===
Also known as HyperKPP. Similar to Paramyotonia Congenita, where potassium exacerbates myotonia in many phenotypes, Hyperkalemic Periodic Paralysis is another disorder of the SCN4A gene where high blood potassium levels result in muscle weakness, muscle paralysis (through weakness or through over excitation preventing movement), and sometimes myotonia. Many phenotypes of HyperKPP result in issues regulating blood potassium levels, often cause it to be high or causing hyperkalemia, further exacerbating the condition.

=== Hypokalemic periodic paralysis ===
Also known as HypoKPP. Similar to HyperKPP above, except that it's triggered by (and often causes) low potassium levels and hypokalemia. It too can result in myotonia, in addition to weakness and paralysis (from both lack of and excess signal to muscles). It also has been found to occur due to gene mutations in the calcium channel gene CACNA1S and, less frequently, in the SCN4A gene.

=== Neuromyotonia ===
Neuromyotonia (also known as Isaacs syndrome or NMT) causes peripheral nerve hyperexcitability that causes spontaneous muscular activity resulting from repetitive motor unit action potentials of peripheral origin. 100-200 cases have been reported.

=== Other ===
Myotonia occurs also in certain types of limb-girdle muscular dystrophies, myofibrillary myopathies, distal myopathies, and inclusion body myopathies. Other channelopathies may cause it as well. It is also associated with Schwartz–Jampel syndrome.

== See also ==
- Hyperekplexia
- Neuromuscular medicine
- Malignant hyperthermia
