= CNBP =

Protein-coding gene in the species Homo sapiens

Identifiers
- Aliases: CNBP, CNBP1, DM2, PROMM, RNF163, ZCCHC22, ZNF9, CCHC-type zinc finger nucleic acid binding protein
- External IDs: OMIM: 116955; MGI: 88431; GeneCards: CNBP

Gene location (Human)
Chr.	Chromosome 3 (human)
Band	3q21.3	Start	129,167,827 bp
Band	3q21.3	End	129,183,922 bp

Gene location (Mouse)
Chr.	Chromosome 6 (mouse)
Band	6|6 D1	Start	87,819,597 bp
Band	6|6 D1	End	87,828,088 bp
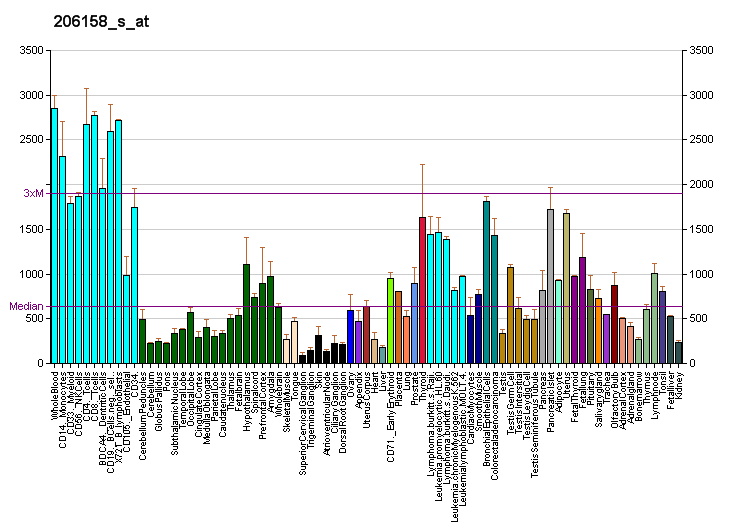
RNA expression pattern
Bgee	Human / Mouse (ortholog); Top expressed in: Skeletal muscle tissue of rectus abdominis; thoracic diaphragm; biceps brachii; Skeletal muscle tissue of biceps brachii; oocyte; Achilles tendon; gastrocnemius muscle; seminal vesicula; parotid gland; tail of epididymis / Top expressed in: otic placode; saccule; otic vesicle; primitive streak; endothelial cell of lymphatic vessel; abdominal wall; hair follicle; vestibular sensory epithelium; triceps brachii muscle; vastus lateralis muscle; More reference expression data
BioGPS	More reference expression data
Gene ontology
Molecular function	protein binding; nucleic acid binding; zinc ion binding; DNA-binding transcription factor activity; metal ion binding; DNA binding; single-stranded DNA binding; single-stranded RNA binding; RNA binding; RNA polymerase II transcription regulatory region sequence-specific DNA binding; DNA-binding transcription repressor activity, RNA polymerase II-specific; mRNA binding; translation regulator activity
Cellular component	nucleus; cytoplasm; endoplasmic reticulum; cytosol
Biological process	regulation of transcription, DNA-templated; cholesterol biosynthetic process; transcription, DNA-templated; positive regulation of transcription by RNA polymerase II; positive regulation of transcription, DNA-templated; positive regulation of cell population proliferation; negative regulation of transcription by RNA polymerase II; positive regulation of cytoplasmic translation
Sources:Amigo / QuickGO
Orthologs
Databases	NCBI: entry; OMA: entry
Species	Human	Mouse
Entrez	7555	12785
Ensembl	ENSG00000169714	ENSMUSG00000030057
UniProt	P62633	P53996
RefSeq (mRNA)	NM_003418; NM_001127192; NM_001127193; NM_001127194; NM_001127195 NM_001127196	NM_001109745; NM_001109746; NM_013493; NM_001347325; NM_001355195
RefSeq (protein)	NP_001120664; NP_001120665; NP_001120666; NP_001120667; NP_001120668 NP_003409	NP_001103215; NP_001103216; NP_001334254; NP_038521; NP_001342124
Location (UCSC)	Chr 3: 129.17 – 129.18 Mb	Chr 6: 87.82 – 87.83 Mb
PubMed search
- Wikidata
View/Edit Human	View/Edit Mouse

Cellular nucleic acid-binding protein is a protein that in humans is encoded by the CNBP gene.

== Function ==
The ZNF9 protein contains 7 zinc finger domains and is believed to function as an RNA-binding protein. A CCTG expansion in intron 1 of the ZNF9 gene results in myotonic dystrophy type 2 (MIM 602668).[supplied by OMIM]
