= CLCN1 =

Protein-coding gene in humans

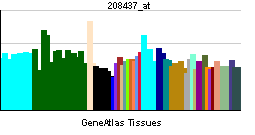

Identifiers
- Aliases: CLCN1, CLC1, chloride voltage-gated channel 1
- External IDs: OMIM: 118425; MGI: 88417; GeneCards: CLCN1

Gene location (Human)
Chr.	Chromosome 7 (human)
Band	7q34	Start	143,316,111 bp
Band	7q34	End	143,352,083 bp

Gene location (Mouse)
Chr.	Chromosome 6 (mouse)
Band	6 B2.1|6 20.57 cM	Start	42,263,619 bp
Band	6 B2.1|6 20.57 cM	End	42,292,690 bp
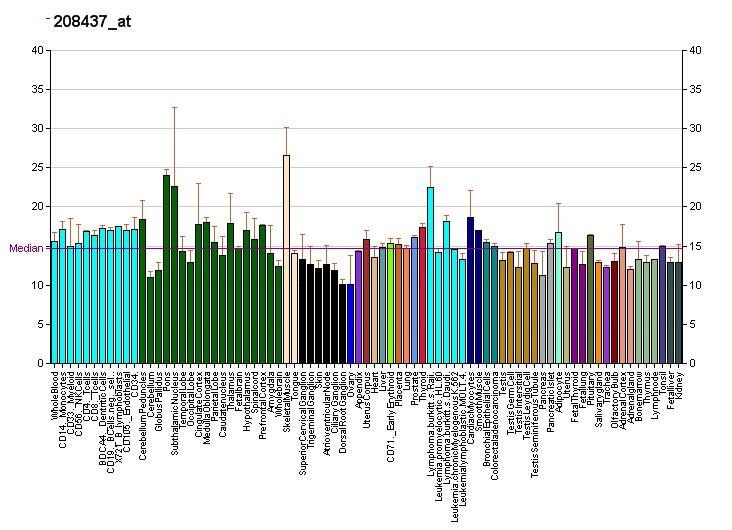
RNA expression pattern
Bgee	Human / Mouse (ortholog); Top expressed in: muscle of thigh; triceps brachii muscle; Skeletal muscle tissue of rectus abdominis; vastus lateralis muscle; biceps brachii; gastrocnemius muscle; Skeletal muscle tissue of biceps brachii; buccal mucosa cell; gonad; body of tongue / Top expressed in: muscle of thigh; extensor digitorum longus muscle; plantaris muscle; skeletal muscle tissue; extraocular muscle; quadriceps femoris muscle; ankle; triceps surae; soleus muscle; tibialis anterior muscle; More reference expression data
BioGPS	More reference expression data
Gene ontology
Molecular function	protein homodimerization activity; voltage-gated ion channel activity; protein binding; chloride channel activity; voltage-gated chloride channel activity
Cellular component	integral component of membrane; membrane; plasma membrane; integral component of plasma membrane; chloride channel complex; sarcolemma
Biological process	muscle contraction; regulation of ion transmembrane transport; chloride transmembrane transport; ion transport; ion transmembrane transport; neuronal action potential propagation; chloride transport; transmembrane transport
Sources:Amigo / QuickGO
Orthologs
Databases	NCBI: entry; OMA: entry
Species	Human	Mouse
Entrez	1180	12723
Ensembl	ENSG00000188037	ENSMUSG00000029862
UniProt	P35523	Q64347
RefSeq (mRNA)	NM_000083	NM_013491; NM_001363712
RefSeq (protein)	NP_000074	NP_038519; NP_001350641
Location (UCSC)	Chr 7: 143.32 – 143.35 Mb	Chr 6: 42.26 – 42.29 Mb
PubMed search
- Wikidata
View/Edit Human	View/Edit Mouse

Chloride channel protein, skeletal muscle (CLCN1) is a protein that in humans is encoded by the CLCN1 gene. CLCN1 regulates the electrical excitability of the skeletal muscle membrane. Mutations in this gene cause the human muscle disorder myotonia congenita, also known as Thomsen disease (when autosomal dominant) and Becker disease (when recessive).

CLCN1 is one of nine genes (CLCN1-CLCN7, CLCNKa and CLCNKb) that make up the CLCN group of voltage-gated chloride channel genes. While these genes have significant sequence homology, they have diverse functional characteristics.

CLCN1 is critical for the normal function of skeletal muscle cells. For the body to move normally, skeletal muscles must tense (contract) and relax in a coordinated way. Muscle contraction and relaxation are controlled by the flow of ions into and out of muscle cells. CLCN1 forms an ion channel that controls the flow of negatively charged chloride ions into these cells. The main function of this channel is to stabilize the cells' electrical charge, enabling muscles to contract normally. In people with congenital myotonia due to a mutation in CLCN1, the ion channel admits too few chloride ions into the cell. This shortage of chloride ions causes prolonged muscle contractions, which are the hallmark of myotonia.
