= Myotonic dystrophy =

Disorder in which muscles fail to relax

- Other names: Dystrophia myotonica, myotonia atrophica, myotonia dystrophica, Curschmann–Batten–Steinert syndrome
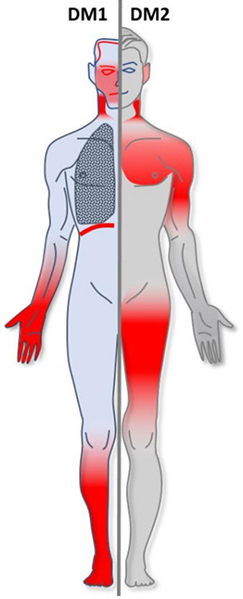
- Areas of the body affected in myotonic dystrophy, types 1 and 2, colored in red
- Specialty: Neurology, neuromuscular medicine, physical medicine and rehabilitation, medical genetics, pediatrics
- Symptoms: Muscle loss, weakness, muscles which myotonia
- Complications: Cataracts, intellectual disability, heart conduction problems
- Usual onset: 20s to 30s
- Duration: Long term
- Types: Type 1, type 2
- Causes: Genetic disorder (autosomal dominant)
- Diagnostic method: Genetic testing.
- Treatment: Braces, wheelchair, pacemakers, non invasive positive pressure ventilation
- Medication: Mexiletine, carbamazepine, tricyclic antidepressants, nonsteroidal anti inflammatory drugs
- Frequency: >1 in 8,000 people

Myotonic dystrophy (DM) is a type of muscular dystrophy, a group of genetic disorders that cause progressive muscle loss and weakness. In DM, muscles are often unable to relax after contraction. Other manifestations may include cataracts, intellectual disability and heart conduction problems. In men, there may be early balding and infertility. While myotonic dystrophy can occur at any age, onset is typically in the 20s and 30s.

Myotonic dystrophy is caused by a genetic mutation in one of two genes. Mutation of the DMPK gene causes myotonic dystrophy type 1 (DM1). Mutation of CNBP gene causes type 2 (DM2). DM is typically inherited, following an autosomal dominant inheritance pattern, and it generally worsens with each generation. A type of DM1 may be apparent at birth. DM2 is generally milder. Diagnosis is confirmed by genetic testing.

There is no cure. Treatments may include braces or wheelchairs, pacemakers and non-invasive positive pressure ventilation. The medications mexiletine or carbamazepine can help relax muscles. Pain, if it occurs, may be treated with tricyclic antidepressants and nonsteroidal anti-inflammatory drugs (NSAIDs).

Myotonic dystrophy affects about 1 in 2,100 people, a number that was long estimated to be much lower (often cited as 1 in 8,000), reflecting that not all patients have immediate symptoms and, once they do have symptoms, the long time it typically takes to get to the right diagnosis. It is the most common form of muscular dystrophy that begins in adulthood. It was first described in 1909, with the underlying cause of type 1 determined in 1992.

== Signs and symptoms ==
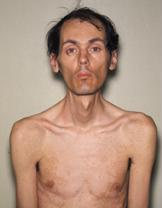
A 40-year-old with myotonic dystrophy who presented with muscle wasting, bilateral cataracts, and complete heart block

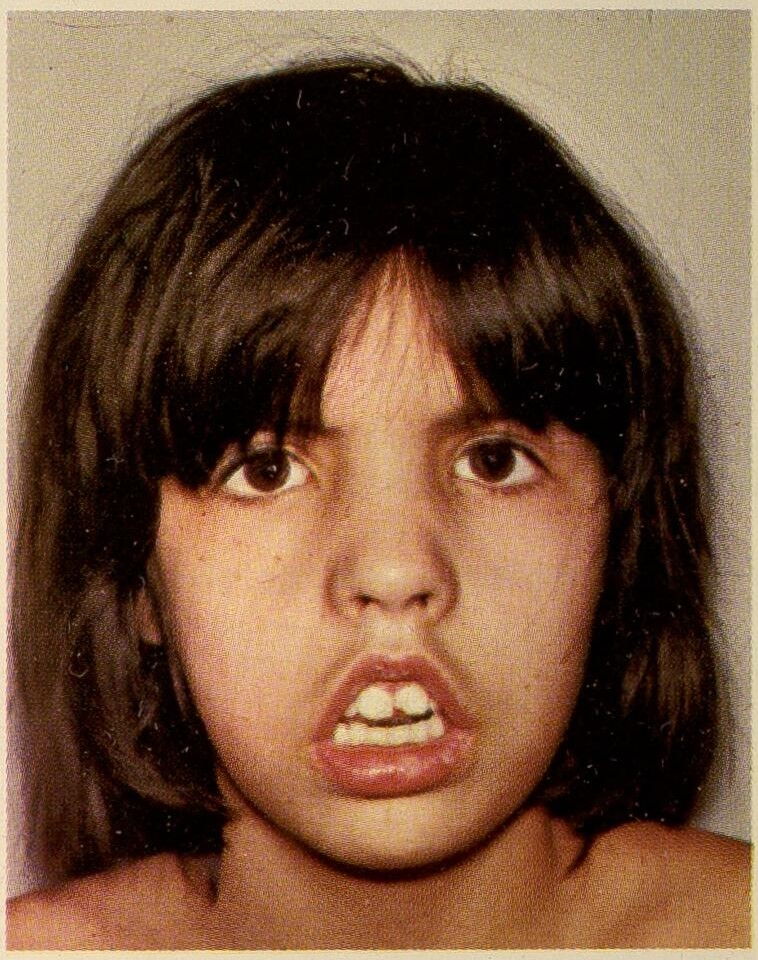
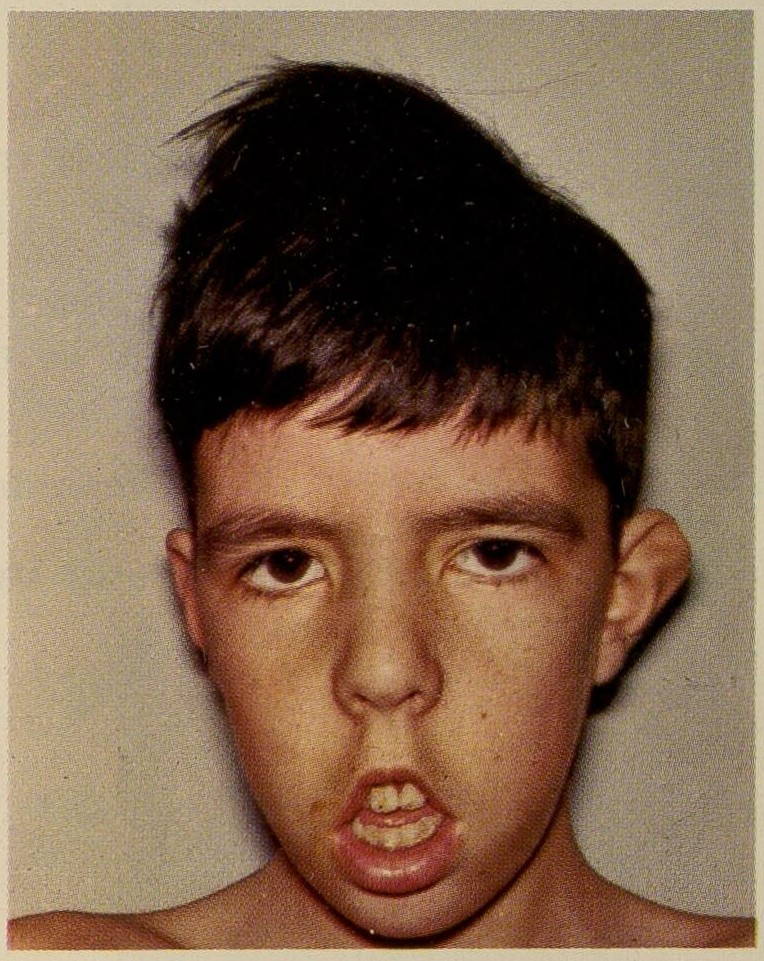
Myotonic dystrophy in a girl (left) and a boy (right)

DM causes muscle weakness, early onset of cataracts, and myotonia, which is delayed relaxation of muscles after contraction. Cataracts can be either cortical cataracts with a blue dot appearance or posterior subcapsular cataracts. Other organs affected include the heart, lungs, gastrointestinal tract, skin, and brain. Insulin resistance can also occur. Signs and symptoms vary considerably by severity, unusual phenotype, and form (DM1/DM2). DM1 and DM2 differ in regards to the muscles they affect, age of onset, severity of disease, and extramuscular manifestations.

=== DM1 ===
DM1 usually begins in the muscles of the hands, feet, neck, or face. One manifestation of facial weakness is drooping of the eyelid (ptosis). It slowly progresses to involve other muscle groups, including the heart. Myotonia tends to be more prominent in DM1 compared to DM2. Other DM1 manifestations include problems with executive function (e.g., organization, concentration, word-finding) and hypersomnia. Abnormalities in the electrical activity of the heart are common in DM1, manifesting as arrhythmias or conduction blocks. Sometimes, dilated cardiomyopathy occurs. Symptoms onset any time from birth to adulthood. The earlier the disease onset, the greater the variety of possible signs and symptoms. Thus, various diagnostic classifications based on the age of onset/severity of the disease have been proposed, although DM1 manifestations likely lie on a continuum.

==== Congenital DM1 ====
When DM1 onsets at birth, it is called congenital DM1. Manifestations that can be present at birth include hypotonia, respiratory failure, feeding difficulty, and club foot (talipes equinovarus), any of which tend to resolve over several years. During childhood, intellectual impairment, attention deficit hyperactivity disorder (ADHD), and autism spectrum disorders (ASD) can result. Gastrointestinal issues can result, which can be severe, manifestations including diarrhea, constipation, and fecal incontinence. The symptoms of adult DM often manifest during adolescence. Infantile DM1 can be distinguished as another disease category, or it can be grouped with congenital DM1 or childhood-onset DM1.

==== Childhood-onset DM1 ====
Childhood-onset DM1 is defined as the onset of symptoms between ages 1 and 10 years. Manifestations include the same intellectual and gastrointestinal symptoms seen in congenital DM1.

=== DM2 ===
DM2 is generally milder than DM1, with generally fewer DM2 people requiring assistive devices than DM1 people. DM2 preferentially affects muscles closer to or on the torso, including the neck flexors, hip flexors, and hip extensors. Muscle pain is prominent in DM2. Heart issues, while still potentially fatal, are less common and severe in DM2 than DM1. Symptoms onset in early to late adulthood. Severe congenital onset, which can occur in DM1, has not been observed in DM2.

== Genetics ==
Myotonic dystrophy is inherited in an autosomal dominant pattern.

Myotonic dystrophy (DM) is a genetic condition that is inherited in an autosomal dominant pattern, meaning each child of an affected individual has a 50% chance of inheriting the disease. The mutation involves satellite DNA, which is tandemly repeated sequences of DNA that do not code for a protein. The repeats implicated in myotonic dystrophy are either 3 or 4 nucleotides in length, classified as microsatellites. Disease results from an abnormally increased number of these microsatellites, termed microsatellite expansion.

=== DM1 ===
The microsatellite expansion responsible for DM1 is of cytosine-thymine-guanine (CTG) triplet repeats, termed trinucleotide repeat expansion and classifying DM1 as one of several trinucleotide repeat disorders. This expansion occurs at the end of the DMPK gene, in the 3' untranslated region. DMPK is located on the long arm of chromosome 19. DMPK codes for myotonic dystrophy protein kinase, a protein expressed predominantly in skeletal muscle.

Between 5 and 37 repeats are considered normal; between 38 and 49 repeats are considered pre-mutation, and although not producing symptoms, children can have further repeat expansion and symptomatic disease; greater than 50 repeats almost invariably is symptomatic, with some noted exceptions. Longer repeats are usually associated with earlier onset and more severe disease.

DMPK alleles with greater than 37 repeats are unstable and additional trinucleotide repeats may be inserted during cell division in mitosis and meiosis. Consequently, the children of individuals with premutations or mutations inherit DMPK alleles that are longer than their parents and therefore are more likely to be affected or display an earlier onset and greater severity of the condition, a phenomenon known as anticipation. Repeat expansion is generally considered to be a consequence of the incorporation of additional bases as a result of strand slippage during either DNA replication or DNA repair synthesis. Misalignments occurring during homologous recombinational repair, double-strand break repair or during other DNA repair processes likely contribute to trinucleotide repeat expansions in DM1. Paternal transmission of the congenital form is uncommon (13%), possibly due to selection pressures against sperm with expanded repeats, but juvenile or adult-onset is equally transmitted from either parent. Anticipation tends to be less severe than in cases of maternal inheritance.

The RNA from the expanded trinucleotide repeat region forms intranucleoplasmic hairpin loops due to the extensive hydrogen bonding between C-G base pairs, and it has been demonstrated that these sequester the splicing regulator MBNL1 to form distinctive foci.

A severe form of DM1, congenital myotonic dystrophy, may appear in newborns of mothers who have DM. Congenital myotonic dystrophy can also be inherited via the paternal gene, although it is said to be relatively rare. Congenital means that the condition is present from birth.

=== DM2 ===
The microsatellite expansion responsible for DM2 is of cytosine-cytosine-thymine-guanine (CCTG) repeats, classifying it as a tetranucleotide repeat disorder. This expansion occurs in the first intron CNBP gene on chromosome 3.

The repeat expansion for DM2 is much larger than for DM1, ranging from 75 to over 11,000 repeats. Like DM1, the size of the microsatellite repeat array lengthens from generation to generation. Unlike DM1, anticipation does not result, as the degree of repeat expansion beyond 75 repeats does not affect the age of onset or disease severity.

The repeat expansion produces an RNA transcript that binds to RNA-binding proteins such as MBNL1, as in DM1. Also, repeat expansion likely reduces expression of CNBP, loss of which causes muscle toxicity.

== Pathophysiology ==
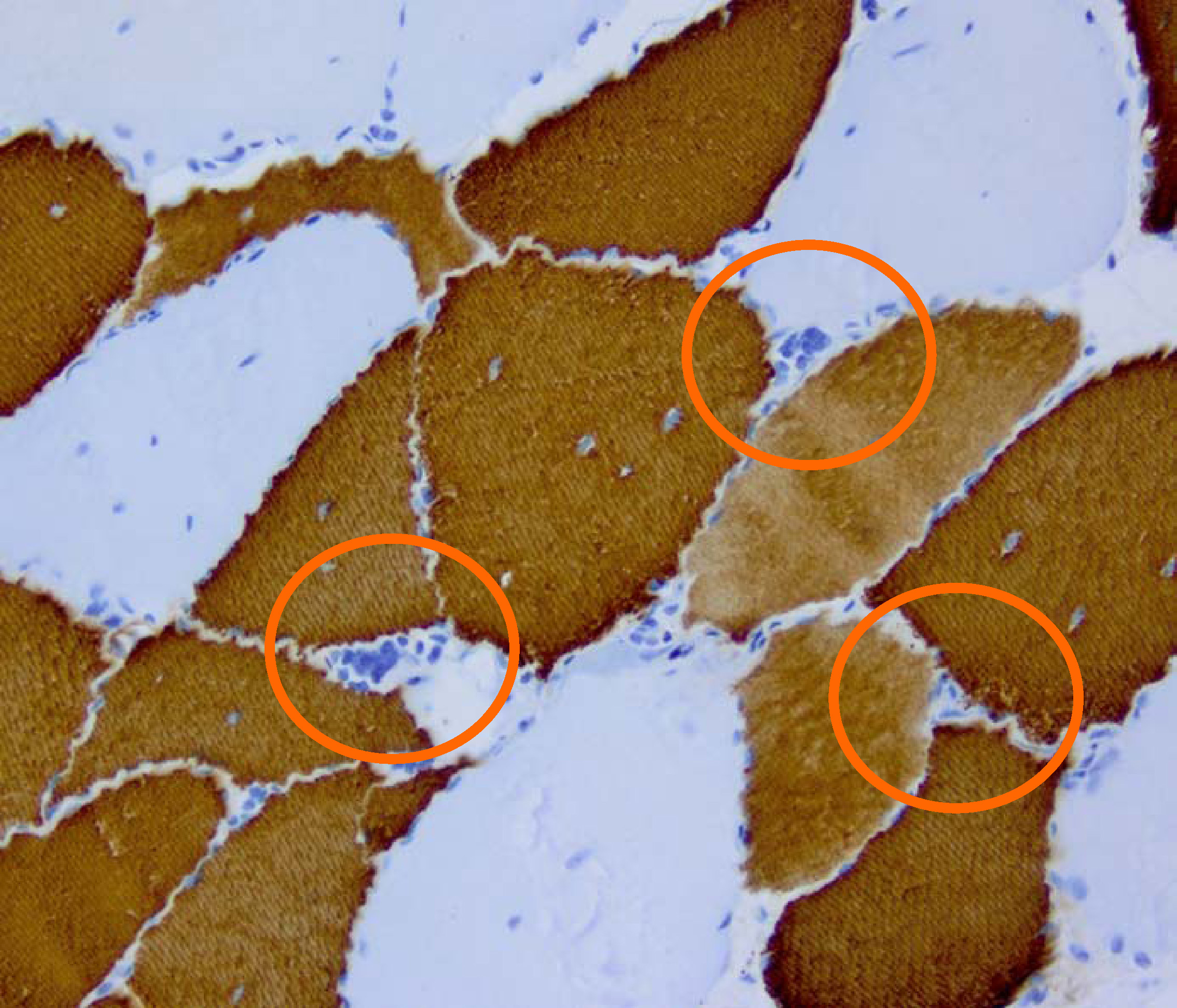
Histopathology of DM2. Muscle biopsy showing mild myopathic changes and grouping of atrophic fast fibers (type 2, highlighted). Immunohistochemical staining for type-1 ("slow") myosin.

=== Molecular ===
Mutations of DM1 and DM2 cause the production of RNA that sequesters RNA-binding proteins, causing dysregulated RNA splicing. This dysregulated RNA splicing is particularly toxic to skeletal, cardiac, and smooth muscle. One example in DM1 involves the chloride channel ClC-1. Mutated DMPK RNA binds to MBNL1, causing ClC-1 pre-mRNA to be spliced into the fetal form instead of the adult form. Functional loss of the chloride channel causes myotonia.

=== Histology ===
In DM1, there can be increased central nuclei, angular fibers, fiber atrophy, and pyknotic clumps. There can be selective atrophy of type 1 muscle fibers. Muscle fibers show signs of degeneration and regeneration. There is modest fibrosis of the endomysium.

In DM2, there can be variation in the sizes of muscle fibers, although often there are no abnormalities. There is selective atrophy of type 2 muscle fibers. Again, there are central nuclei and nuclear clumps.

== Diagnosis ==
The diagnosis of DM1 and DM2 can be difficult due to the large number of neuromuscular disorders, most of which are very rare. One study found that diagnosis is made an average of seven years after symptom onset for DM1, and fourteen years for DM2.

As a result, people with multiple symptoms that may be explained by a complex disorder such as DM1 or DM2 will generally be referred by their primary care physician to a neurologist for diagnosis. Depending on the presentation of symptoms, people may be referred to a number of medical specialists including cardiologists, ophthalmologists, endocrinologists, and rheumatologists. In addition, the clinical presentation is obscured by the degree of severity or the presence of unusual phenotypes.

Though there is presently no cure for DM and management is currently symptom-based, a precise diagnosis is still necessary to anticipate multiple other problems that may develop over time (e.g. cataracts). An accurate diagnosis is important to assist with appropriate medical monitoring and management of symptoms. In addition, genetic counseling should be made available to all people because of the high risk of transmission. Potentially serious anesthetic risks are important to note, so the presence of this disorder should be brought to the attention of all medical providers.

=== Classification ===
Myotonic dystrophy subtypes
Type	Gene	Repeat	Anticipation	Severity
DM1	DMPK	CTG	Yes	Moderate-severe
DM2	ZNF9	CCTG	Minimal/none	Mild-moderate

There are two main types of myotonic dystrophy. Type 1 (DM1), also known as Steinert disease, has a severe congenital form and a milder childhood-onset form as well as an adult-onset form. This disease is most often in the facial muscles, levator palpebrae superioris, temporalis, sternocleidomastoids, distal muscles of the forearm, hand intrinsic muscles, and ankle dorsiflexors. Type 2 (DM2), also known as proximal myotonic myopathy (PROMM), is rarer and generally manifests with milder signs and symptoms than DM1.

Other forms of myotonic dystrophy not associated with DM1 or DM2 genetic mutations have been described. One case which was proposed as a candidate for the "DM3" label, was later characterized as an unusual form of inclusion body myopathy associated with Paget's disease and frontotemporal dementia.

=== Genetic testing ===
Genetic tests, including prenatal testing, are available for both confirmed forms. Molecular testing is considered the gold standard of diagnosis.

==== Prenatal testing ====
Testing at pregnancy to determine whether an unborn child is affected is possible if genetic testing in a family has identified a DMPK mutation. This can be done at 10–12 weeks gestation by a procedure called chorionic villus sampling (CVS) that involves removing a tiny piece of the placenta and analyzing DNA from its cells. It can also be done by amniocentesis after 14 weeks gestation by removing a small amount of the amniotic fluid surrounding the baby and analyzing the cells in the fluid. Each of these procedures has a small risk of miscarriage associated with it and those who are interested in learning more should check with their doctor or genetic counselor. There is also another procedure called preimplantation diagnosis that allows a couple to have a child that is unaffected by the genetic condition in their family. This procedure is experimental and not widely available. Those interested in learning more about this procedure should check with their doctor or genetic counselor.

==== Predictive testing ====
It is possible to test someone who is at risk for developing DM1 before they show symptoms to see whether they inherited an expanded trinucleotide repeat. This is called predictive testing. Predictive testing cannot determine the age of onset at which someone will begin to have symptoms or the course of the disease. If the child is not having symptoms, the testing is not possible except for emancipated minors as a policy.

=== Auxiliary testing ===
Electrodiagnostic testing (EMG and NCS) can detect the electrical signs of myotonia before myotonia becomes noticeable to the affected individual.

Muscle biopsy can reveal damage to the muscle, but findings are generally nonspecific and do not greatly aid in diagnosis.

== Management ==
There is currently no cure for or treatment specific to myotonic dystrophy. Management is focused on the complications of the disease, particularly those related to the lungs and heart, which are life-threatening. Complications relating to the cardiopulmonary system account for 70% of deaths due to DM1. Compromised lung function can, in turn, contribute to life-threatening complications during anesthesia and pregnancy.

Lung complications are the leading cause of death in DM1, warranting lung function monitoring with pulmonary function tests every 6 months. Central sleep apnea or obstructive sleep apnea may cause excessive daytime sleepiness, and these individuals should undergo a sleep study. Non-invasive ventilation may be offered if there is an abnormality. Otherwise, there is evidence for the use of modafinil as a central nervous system stimulant, although a Cochrane review has described the evidence thus far as inconclusive.

Cardiac complications are the second leading cause of death in DM1, and commonly no symptoms are present before adverse events. All affected individuals are advised to have an annual or biennial ECG. Pacemaker insertion may be required for individuals with cardiac conduction abnormalities. Improving the quality of life which can be measured using specific questionnaires is also a main objective of medical care.

=== Physical activity ===
There is a lack of high-quality evidence to determine the effectiveness and the safety of physical activities for people who have myotonic dystrophy. Further research is required to determine if combined strength and aerobic training at moderate intensity is safe for people who have neuromuscular diseases, however the combination of aerobic and strength exercises may increase muscle strength. Aerobic exercise via stationary bicycle with an ergometer may be safe and effective in improving fitness in people with DM1. Cardiovascular impairments and myotonic sensitivities to exercise and temperature necessitate close monitoring of people and educating people in self-monitoring during exercise via the Borg scale, heart rate monitors, and other physical exertion measurements.

=== Orthotics ===
Muscular weakness of dorsiflexors (dorsiflexion) hinders the ability to clear the floor during the swing phase of gait and people may adopt a steppage gait pattern or ankle-foot-orthotics may be indicated. Factors such as hand function, skin integrity, and comfort must be assessed before prescription. Neck braces can also be prescribed for neck muscle weakness.

=== Mobility aids and adaptive equipment ===
Upper and lower limb weakness, visual impairments, and myotonia may lead to the need for mobility aids and functional adaptive equipment such as buttonhooks and handled sponges for optimal hand function. If assistive devices and home adaptations are needed, physical therapists may refer to occupational therapist(s) for further assessment.

== Prognosis ==
Life expectancy in non-congenital late-onset or adult onset DM1 is in the early 50s, with pulmonary complications being the leading cause of death, followed by cardiac complications. DM2 life expectancy has yet to be studied.

== Epidemiology ==
The prevalence of DM1 ranges from 5 to 20 per 100,000 (1:20,000–1:5000). Up to 48 per 100,000 (1:2100) individuals tested positive for the mutation of DM1 in New York, although not all of these individuals would have become symptomatic. Again in New York, premutations for DM1 were found in 191 per 100,000 (1:525). DM2 prevalence is unknown, but genetic studies estimate it to be as high as 1:1830. DM affects males and females approximately equally. About 30,000 people in the United States are affected. In most populations, DM1 appears to be more common than DM2. However, recent studies suggest that type 2 may be as common as type 1 among people in Germany and Finland.

DM1 is the most common form of myotonic muscular dystrophy diagnosed in children, with a prevalence ranging from 1 per 100,000 in Japan to 3–15 per 100,000 in Europe. The prevalence may be as high as 1 in 500 in regions such as Quebec, possibly due to the founder effect. The incidence of congenital myotonic dystrophy is thought to be about 1:20,000.

== History ==
Myotonic dystrophy was first described by a German physician, Hans Gustav Wilhelm Steinert, who first published a series of six cases of the condition in 1909. Isolated case reports of myotonia had been published previously, including reports by Frederick Eustace Batten and Hans Curschmann, and type 1 myotonic dystrophy is therefore sometimes known as Curschmann-Batten-Steinert syndrome. The underlying cause of type 1 myotonic dystrophy was determined in 1992.

== Research directions ==
Altered splicing of the muscle-specific chloride channel 1 (ClC-1) has been shown to cause the myotonic phenotype of DM1 and is reversible in mouse models using Morpholino antisense to modify splicing of ClC-1 mRNA.

Some small studies have suggested that imipramine, clomipramine, and taurine may be useful in the treatment of myotonia. However, due to the weak evidence and potential side effects such as cardiac arrhythmias, these treatments are rarely used. A recent study in December 2015 showed that a common FDA-approved antibiotic, erythromycin, reduced myotonia in mice. Human studies are planned for erythromycin. Erythromycin has been used successfully in patients with gastric issues.
