= Potassium-aggravated myotonia =

- Other names: PAM
- This condition is inherited in an autosomal dominant manner

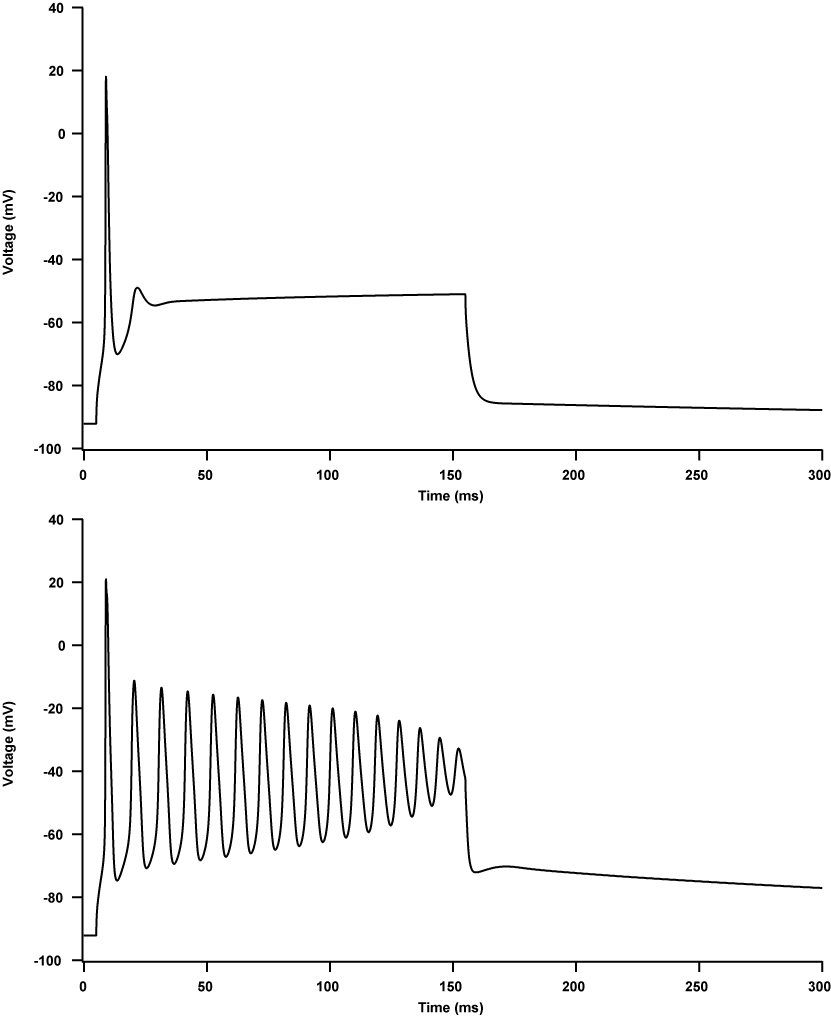
myotonia figure.png

Potassium-aggravated myotonia is a rare genetic disorder that affects skeletal muscle. Beginning in childhood or adolescence, people with this condition experience bouts of sustained muscle tensing (myotonia) that prevent muscles from relaxing normally. Myotonia causes muscle stiffness, often painful, that worsens after exercise and may be aggravated by eating potassium-rich foods such as bananas and potatoes. Stiffness occurs in skeletal muscles throughout the body. Potassium-aggravated myotonia ranges in severity from mild episodes of muscle stiffness to severe, disabling disease with frequent attacks. Potassium-aggravated myotonia may, in some cases, also cause paradoxical myotonia, in which myotonia becomes more severe at the time of movement instead of after movement has ceased. Unlike some other forms of myotonia, potassium-aggravated myotonia is not associated with episodes of muscle weakness.

Mutations in the SCN4A gene cause potassium-aggravated myotonia. The SCN4A gene provides instructions for making a protein that is critical for the normal function of skeletal muscle cells. For the body to move normally, skeletal muscles contract and relax in a coordinated way. Muscle contractions are triggered by the flow of positively charged ions, including sodium, into skeletal muscle cells. The SCN4A protein forms channels that control the flow of sodium ions into these cells. Mutations in the SCN4A gene alter the usual structure and function of sodium channels. The altered channels cannot properly regulate ion flow, increasing the movement of sodium ions into skeletal muscle cells. The influx of extra sodium ions triggers prolonged muscle contractions, which are the hallmark of myotonia.

Potassium-aggravated myotonia is inherited in an autosomal dominant pattern, which means one copy of the altered gene in each cell is sufficient to cause the disorder. In some cases, an affected person inherits a mutation in the SCN4A gene from one affected parent. Other cases result from new mutations in the gene. These cases occur in people with no history of the disorder in their family.
