= Hoffmann syndrome =

Medical condition

Hoffmann syndrome is a rare form of hypothyroid myopathy and is not to be confused with Werdnig–Hoffmann disease (a type of spinal muscular atrophy).

It was first documented in 1897 by Johann Hoffmann. It has adult-onset symptoms. It is comparable to the childhood-onset Kocher–Debré–Semelaigne syndrome. It is caused by low thyroid hormones (T3 and T4) with elevated TSH.

== Signs and symptoms ==
Signs and symptoms include exercise intolerance, muscle fatigue, muscle cramps, myalgia, delayed muscle relaxation (pseudomyotonia), proximal muscle weakness, delayed deep tendon reflexes (hyporeflexia) especially of the ankles, and a pseudoathletic appearance of hypertrophic calf muscles. There may also be bradycardia, mild anemia, dry skin, hoarse voice, and cold intolerance. EMG may be normal, neuropathic, myopathic, or mixed type. Serum CK may be normal or raised. The sign of myoedema (raised muscle tissue in response to percussive tactile stimulus) may be observed. Treatment is thyroid hormone replacement therapy, and prognosis is generally good. Hypertrophic calves typically return to normal after approximately 3 months of treatment.

== Cause ==
It is caused by low thyroid hormones (T3 and T4).

== Diagnosis ==
Muscle biopsy of hypothyroid myopathy shows atrophy of type II (fast-twitch/glycolytic) muscle fibres and a predominance of type I (slow-twitch/oxidative) muscle fibres; as well as abnormally high glycogen accumulation. The reason for the muscle hypertrophy in Hoffmann syndrome is not clearly established; it may be due to altered carbohydrate metabolism, mucoid deposits, or glycosaminoglycan deposits. In an individual diagnosed with Hoffmann syndrome whose hypertrophy did not improve after thyroid hormone replacement therapy, muscle biopsy showed hypertrophy of muscle fibres with increased nuclei, few necrotic fibres and mucoid deposits in places.

=== Differential diagnoses ===
Diseases known to have a pseudoathletic appearance of the calves (hypertrophy or pseudohypertrophy), including exercise intolerance and/or muscle weakness:

- Kocher–Debré–Semelaigne syndrome (childhood-onset hypothyroid myopathy),
- Glycogen storage disease (GSD-V, & late-onset GSD-II),
- Non-dystrophic myotonias and pseudomyotonias (such as Myotonia congenita and Brody disease),
- Limb-girdle muscular dystrophy,
- Duchenne and Becker muscular dystrophy
- Focal myositis,
- Sarcoid granulomas, and
- Amyloid deposits in muscles

Thyroid metabolism can be disrupted secondary to a primary disease. A common comorbidity of the metabolic myopathy McArdle disease (Glycogen storage disease type V) is hypothyroidism. It is also a comorbidity of late-onset Pompe disease (Glycogen storage disease type II). As both hyper- and hypothyroidism disrupts muscle glycogen metabolism, it is important to keep in mind differential diagnoses and their comorbidities when trying to determine whether signs and symptoms are either primary or secondary disease.
