= Kocher–Debre–Semelaigne syndrome =

Hypothyroidism in infancy or childhood

Kocher–Debré–Semelaigne syndrome
- Other names: Debré–Semelaigne syndrome, cretinism-muscular hypertrophy, hypothyroidism-large muscle syndrome, hypothyreotic muscular hypertrophy in children, infantile myxoedema-muscular hypertrophy, myopathy-myxoedema syndrome, myxoedema-muscular hypertrophy syndrome, myxoedema-myotonic dystrophy syndrome, muscular pseudohypertrophy-hypothyroidism syndrome

Kocher–Debré–Semelaigne syndrome (KDSS) is hypothyroidism in infancy or childhood characterised by lower extremity or generalized muscular hypertrophy (Herculean appearance), myxoedema, short stature, and cognitive impairment.

The syndrome is named after Emil Theodor Kocher, Robert Debré and Georges Semelaigne. Also known as Debré–Semelaigne syndrome or cretinism-muscular hypertrophy, hypothyroid myopathy, hypothyroidism-large muscle syndrome, hypothyreotic muscular hypertrophy in children, infantile myxoedema-muscular hypertrophy, myopathy-myxoedema syndrome, myxoedema-muscular hypertrophy syndrome, myxoedema-myotonic dystrophy syndrome.

The adult-onset form of this syndrome is Hoffmann syndrome. Some sources claim that two of the differentiating symptoms between KDSS and Hoffmann syndrome is that Hoffmann syndrome lacks painful spasms and pseudomyotonia; however, this claim is in conflict with other sources that list these symptoms as also being present in Hoffmann syndrome.

== Presentation ==
The age at which a child presents with KDSS may vary from new born to as late as 11 years of age. This disease is very rare as only less than 10% of children with hypothyroid myopathy develops this condition. Along with features of hypothyroidism (such as lethargy, slow heart rate, cold intolerance, dry skin, and hoarse voice) the main additional feature is muscle hypertrophy. It can happen in any muscle of the limbs, but commonly affects the calf muscles, giving the typical Herculean appearance.

Other features are pseudomyotonia, myokymia, slow tendon reflex, slowed muscle contractions and relaxations, muscle stiffness, proximal muscle weakness and myopathy. The severity of these symptoms are determined by the period of hypothyroidism and the degree of deficiency of thyroid hormones. It may also include macroglossia.

EMG is either normal or may show myopathic low amplitude and short duration motor unit action potentials (MUAPS). The enzymes creatine kinase is elevated usually.

== Pathophysiology ==
The assumed cause of muscle hypertrophy in KDSS is an abnormal metabolism of carbohydrates leading to increased glycogen accumulation and increased mucopolysaccharide deposits in the muscles. Yet another speculation is an excess intra cellular calcium due to ineffective reuptake into the sarcoplasmic reticulum, which causes a sustained contraction and thereby hypertrophy.

In hypothyroidism the fast twitch muscle fiber is converted to slow twitch fiber, causing the slower reflex or hung up reflex. This may occur as a result of reduction in muscle mitochondrial oxidative capacity and beta-adrenergic receptors, as well as the induction of an insulin-resistant state, due to decrease in thyroid hormones.

The causes for muscle weakness is said to be decrease in muscle carnitine, decreased muscle oxidation, expression of a slower ATPase in myosin chain and decreased transport across the cell membrane.

The rigidity associated with congenital hypothyroidism may be due to abnormal development of basal ganglia.

== Differential diagnoses ==
Diseases known to have a pseudoathletic appearance of the calves (hypertrophy or pseudohypertrophy), including exercise intolerance and/or muscle weakness:

- Hoffmann syndrome (adult-onset hypothyroid myopathy),
- Glycogen storage disease (GSD-V, & late-onset GSD-II),
- Non-dystrophic myotonias and pseudomyotonias (such as Myotonia congenita and Brody disease),
- Limb-girdle muscular dystrophy,
- Duchenne and Becker muscular dystrophy
- Focal myositis,
- Sarcoid granulomas, and
- Amyloid deposits in muscles

Thyroid metabolism can be disrupted secondary to a primary disease. A common comorbidity of the metabolic myopathy McArdle disease (Glycogen storage disease type V) is hypothyroidism. It is also a comorbidity of late-onset Pompe disease (Glycogen storage disease type II). As both hyper- and hypothyroidism disrupts muscle glycogen metabolism, it is important to keep in mind differential diagnoses and their comorbidities when trying to determine whether signs and symptoms are either primary or secondary disease.

== Treatment ==
The muscle hypertrophy and other symptoms are reversible on treatment with levothyroxine.
