= Pseudoathletic appearance =

False appearance of an athletic body due to disease or injury

- Other names: Herculean appearance, Bodybuilder-like appearance
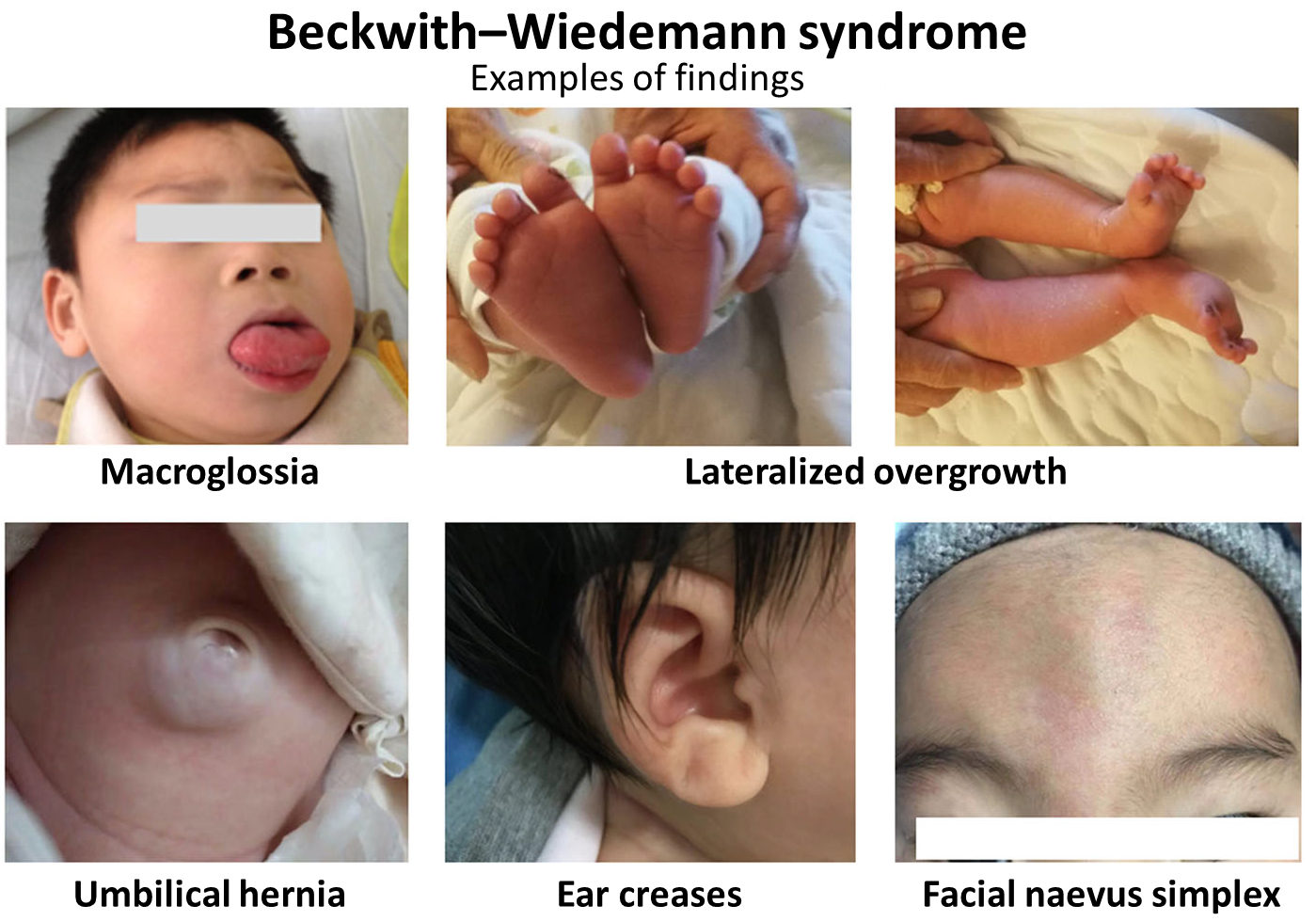

Pseudoathletic appearance is a medical sign meaning to have the false appearance of a well-trained athlete due to pathologic causes (disease or injury) instead of true athleticism. It is also referred to as a Herculean or bodybuilder-like appearance. It may be the result of muscle inflammation (immunity-related swelling), muscle hyperplasia, muscle hypertrophy, muscle pseudohypertrophy (muscle atrophy with infiltration of fat or other tissue), or symmetrical subcutaneous (under the skin) deposits of fat or other tissue.

The mechanism resulting in this sign may stay consistent or may change, while the sign itself remains. For instance, some individuals with Duchenne and Becker muscular dystrophy may start with true muscle hypertrophy, but later develop into pseudohypertrophy.

In healthy individuals, resistance training and heavy manual labour creates muscle hypertrophy through signalling from mechanical stimulation (mechanotransduction) and from sensing available energy reserves (such as AMP through AMP-activated protein kinase); however, in the absence of a sports or vocational explanation for muscle hypertrophy, especially with accompanying muscle symptoms (such as myalgia, cramping, or exercise intolerance), then a neuromuscular disorder should be suspected.

As muscle hypertrophy is a response to strenuous anaerobic activity, ordinary everyday activity would become strenuous in diseases that result in premature muscle fatigue (neural or metabolic), or disrupt the excitation-contraction coupling in muscle, or cause repetitive or sustained involuntary muscle contractions (fasciculations, myotonia, or spasticity). In lipodystrophy, an abnormal deficit of subcutaneous fat accentuates the appearance of the muscles, though in some forms the muscles are quantifiably hypertrophic (possibly due to a metabolic abnormality).

== Diseases ==
=== Skeletal muscle ===
Disease grouping	Disease	Muscle(s) typically affected	Age of onset	Biopsy, ultrasonography, CT scan or MRI
Hyperplasia	Myostatin-related muscle hypertrophy (MSTN gene)	General	Prenatal-onset	Myofibre hyperplasia and decreased adipose tissue.
Hyperplasia	Beckwith–Wiedemann syndrome	Macroglossia /hemihypertrophy of limb or body	Prenatal to infantile-onset	Wide phenotypic variability. Macroglossia (enlarged tongue) and hemihyperplasia (enlargement on one side of the body) in general or an isolated limb.
Hyperplasia	Aberrant muscle syndrome (congenital muscular hyperplasia of the hand and/or foot) (PIK3CA-related overgrowth spectrum)	Hand and/or foot	Childhood-onset	Muscle hyperplasia and ectopic (out of place) striated muscle fibres in dermis and hypodermis.
Parasitic	Disseminated muscular cysticercosis syndrome	General /calf muscle	Variable	Pork tapeworm cysts
Parasitic	Trichinosis	General	Variable	Skeletal muscle inflammation (myositis) secondary to roundworm cysts and larvae.
Inflammation	Inflammatory myopathies (Focal myositis, polymyositis, granulomatous myositis, inclusion body myositis)	Calf muscle/general		
Inflammation	Sarcoid granulomas/Sarcoidosis	Calf muscle/general		Inflammatory cells and deposits of sarcoid granulomas
Inflammation	Amyloid deposits/Amyloidosis (Inflammatory protein serum amyloid A, or in association with inflammatory diseases)	Calf muscle/general		Amyloid deposits
Ossification	Fibrodysplasia ossificans progressiva (formerly known as myositis ossificans progressiva)	General		Episodic inflammatory flare-ups involving skeletal muscle (myositis) secondary to muscle tissue turning into bone (ossification)
Ossification	Non-hereditary myositis ossificans	General		Episodic inflammatory flare-ups involving skeletal muscle (myositis) secondary to muscle tissue turning into bone (ossification)
Muscular dystrophy	Duchenne muscular dystrophy	Calf muscle /general	Childhood-onset	Muscle hypertrophy may precede pseudohypertrophy by infiltration of fatty tissue
Muscular dystrophy	Becker muscular dystrophy	Calf muscle /general	Variable	Muscle hypertrophy may precede pseudohypertrophy by infiltration of fatty tissue
Muscular dystrophy	Facioscapulohumeral muscular dystrophy	Calf muscle/infraspinatus /deltoid muscles		"Poly-hill sign" (hypertrophy and atrophy of shoulder girdle muscles) and "Popeye sign" (atrophy of biceps, but spared forearm).
Muscular dystrophy	Myotonic dystrophy types 1 & 2	Calf muscle	Variable	Variable. Calf muscle hypertrophy rare in type 1, EMG showing persistent myotonic discharges in affected muscles. Calf muscle hypertrophy common in type 2 (about 50%), EMG may be normal or show myotonic discharges.
Muscular dystrophy	Limb-girdle muscular dystrophy (LGMD) types R1 (formerly, 2A), R3 (2D), R4 (2E), R5 (2C), R6 (2F), R7 (2G), R8 (2H), R9 (2I), R10 (2J), R11 (2K), R12 (2L), R13 (2M), R14 (2N), R15 (2O), R16 (2P), R19 (2T), R20 (2U), R23, R24, R26, R28	Calf muscle /macroglossia /general	Variable	Hypertrophy and/or pseudohypertrophy by fatty infiltration of muscle. Classic dystrophic changes include myonecrosis and regeneration, variations in muscle fibre size, myofibrosis, fatty infiltration. LGMD1H shows histochemical evidence suggestive of a mitochondrial myopathy and since 2017 was excluded from LGMD (see below under metabolic myopathy).
Muscular dystrophy	Muscular dystrophy-dystroglycanopathy (MDDG) (types A2, A4, B1, B2, B5, B6, C2, C3, C4, C5, C7, C8, C9, C12, C14)	Calf muscle		Hypertrophy and/or pseudohypertrophy by fatty infiltration of muscle.
Muscular dystrophy	Myopathy, X-linked, with postural muscle atrophy (formerly Emery–Dreifuss muscular dystrophy 6, X-linked)	Proximal muscles	Variable (late childhood to adult-onset)	Muscle hypertrophy precedes muscle atrophy. Biopsy shows myopathic or dystrophic changes, rimmed vacuoles, cytoplasmic bodies, and granulofilamentous material.
Muscular dystrophy	Emery–Dreifuss muscular dystrophy 2, autosomal dominant (EDMD2) (formerly, LGMD1B)	Calf muscle	Childhood-onset	Calf muscle hypertrophy. Biopsy shows neurogenic and myopathic changes, including fibre type variation, central nuclei, fibrosis and fatty infiltration. EMG myopathic.
Muscular dystrophy	Miyoshi muscular dystrophy 3	Calf muscles /extensor digitorum brevis muscles	Adult-onset	Muscle hypertrophy and/or pseudohypertrophy by infiltration of fatty tissue. Muscle hypertrophy precedes muscle atrophy.
Muscular dystrophy	Myopathy, vacuolar, with CASQ1 aggregates	Calf muscle	Adolescence to adult-onset	Calf muscle hypertrophy in some. Muscle biopsy shows vacuoles predominantly in type II (fast-twitch/glycolytic) fibres, rare necrotic fibres, CASQ1-immunopositive inclusions, decreased density of calcium release units, abnormal sarcoplasmic reticulum elements, enlarged terminal cisternae of the sarcoplasmic reticulum, and enlarged vesicles of sarcoplasmic reticulum origin.
Muscular dystrophy	Myofibrillar myopathy 3 (MFM3) (MYOT gene, Ser55Phe missense mutation phenotype) (formerly, LGMD1A)	Neck, trunk, thigh and leg muscles	Adult-onset	Pseudohypertrophy by infiltration of fatty tissue. Muscle biopsy showed myofibrillar myopathy with prominent protein aggregates, type I (slow-twitch/oxidative) fibre predominance, other abnormalities. EMG myopathic with spontaneous activity at rest, with or without complex repetitive discharges. Muscles felt stiff upon palpitation
Muscular dystrophy	Myofibrillar myopathy 8 (MFM8) (PYROXD1 gene)	Rectus femoris/calf muscle	Variable	Hypertrophy and/or pseudohypertrophy by infiltration of fatty tissue. Fatty atrophy of muscle common, except the rectus femoris (a thigh muscle) commonly spared or hypertrophic. Pseudohypertrophy of calf muscles. EMG myopathic. Muscle biopsy commonly showed dystrophic changes, myofibrillar inclusions, nemaline rods, internalized nuclei, other myopathic features.
Muscular dystrophy	Myofibrillar myopathy 9 with early respiratory failure (MFM9)	Calf muscle	Variable adult-onset (20s-70s)	Calf muscle hypertrophy. EMG myopathic. Muscle biopsy myopathic or dystrophic changes with fibre splitting, eosinophilic cytoplasmic inclusions consistent with myofibrillar myopathy, rimmed vacuoles, and increased connective or fatty tissue.
Muscular dystrophy	Myofibrillar myopathy 10 (MFM10)	Trapezius and latissimus dorsi muscles	Childhood to young adult-onset	Hypertrophic neck and shoulder girdle muscles. Muscle biopsy shows structural abnormalities, lobulated type I (slow-twitch/oxidative) muscle fibres, irregular intermyofibrillar network, autophagic vacuoles with lipoprotein deposits, and sarcolemmal abnormalities.
Muscular dystrophy	Myofibrillar myopathy 11 (MFM11)	Calf muscle	Childhood-onset	Pseudohypertrophic calf muscles (mild fatty infiltration seen on MRI). Biopsy shows type I (slow-twitch/oxidative) fibre predominance, centralized nuclei, core-like lesions, abnormal myofibrillar aggregates or inclusions. EMG myopathic.
Muscular dystrophy	Myopathy, distal, Tateyama type (MPDT)	Calf muscle	Childhood to young adult onset	Hypertrophic calf muscles. Atrophy in muscles of hands and feet. Biopsy shows internal nuclei, absence of CAV3 staining, mild variation in fibre size, type I (slow-twitch/oxidative) fibre type predominance. EMG myopathic, low amplitude and short duration MUAPs.
Muscular dystrophy	Myopathy, distal, infantile-onset	Calf muscle	Infantile-onset	Hypertrophic calf muscles. Biopsy shows fibre size variation, increased internal nuclei, degenerating fibres, increased connective tissue and fat. EMG myopathic in affected muscles, normal in peroneal (outer calf) muscles.
Muscular dystrophy	Muscular dystrophy, autosomal recessive, with cardiomyopathy and triangular tongue (MDRCMTT) (formerly, LGMD2W)	Calf muscle and macroglossia	Childhood-onset	Hypertrophic calf muscles and enlarged tongue with a small tip (triangle tongue). Biopsy shows dystrophic features with fibre size variation, necrotic fibres, scattered fibrosis and fatty infiltration.
Non-dystrophic myotonias and pseudomyotonias (delayed muscle relaxation)	Myotonia congenita (Chloride channelopathy, CLCN1 gene)	Calf muscle /general		Calf muscle hypertrophy.
Non-dystrophic myotonias and pseudomyotonias (delayed muscle relaxation)	Potassium-aggravated myotonia, paramyotonia congenita (Sodium channelopathy, SCN4A gene)	Calf muscle /general		Muscle hypertrophy.
Non-dystrophic myotonias and pseudomyotonias (delayed muscle relaxation)	Brody disease (formerly, Brody myopathy)	Calf muscle		Variable Commonly marked variability of muscle fibre size, type II (fast-twitch/glycolytic) muscle fibres may be abnormally increased or decreased, usually increased internal nuclei, rarely nuclear centralization or nuclear clumping. Muscle activity is electrically silent on EMG.
Non-dystrophic myotonias and pseudomyotonias (delayed muscle relaxation)	Rippling muscle disease (RMD) types 1 & 2 (RMD2 formerly, LGMD1C)	Calf muscle /general		Muscle hypertrophy. Muscle activity is electrically silent on EMG.
Lipodystrophy	Familial partial lipodystrophy (Köbberling–Dunnigan syndrome)	Calf muscle /general	Adolescence-onset	Hypertrophy of calf muscles
Lipodystrophy	Congenital generalized lipodystrophy (Berardinelli–Seip syndrome)	General	Infantile-onset	Muscle hypertrophy
Hypertonia (spasticity or rigidity)	Spastic cerebral palsy	Calf muscle	Childhood-onset	accumulation of hydroxyproline (aminoacid exclusive to collagen) in calf muscles
Hypertonia (spasticity or rigidity)	Stiff-person syndrome	Torso/limbs	Adult-onset	Muscle hypertrophy and EMG demonstrates co-contraction of agonist and antagonist muscles and/or continuous motor unit activity in affected muscles.
Denervation (pseudo)hypertrophy	Peripheral nerve traumatic injury	Calf muscle	Variable	
Denervation (pseudo)hypertrophy	Disorders of the anterior horn cells (such as poliomyelitis, spinal muscular atrophy, and Charcot–Marie–Tooth disease)	Calf muscle	Variable	
Denervation (pseudo)hypertrophy	Radiculopathy (pinched nerve)	Calf muscle/thigh muscle	Adult-onset	Variable. Hypertrophy or pseudohypertrophy by fatty infiltration of muscle.
Endocrine myopathies	Kocher–Debre–Semelaigne syndrome	Calf muscle/general	Childhood-onset	Muscle hypertrophy, abnormal glycogen accumulation (impaired glycogenolysis), mucopolysaccharide deposits, atrophy of type II (fast-twitch/glycolytic) muscle fibres. EMG normal or myopathic low amplitude and short MUAPs (motor unit action potentials), decrease in muscle carnitine.
Endocrine myopathies	Hoffmann syndrome	Calf muscle/general	Adult-onset	Variable (with or without mucoid deposits). Muscle hypertrophy, abnormal glycogen accumulation (impaired glycogenolysis), mucopolysaccharide deposits, atrophy of type II (fast-twitch/glycolytic) muscle fibres, damaged mitochondria. EMG may be normal, neuropathic, myopathic, or mixed type. Decrease in muscle carnitine.
Endocrine myopathies	Denervation pseudohypertrophy of calf muscles secondary to diabetic neuropathy	Calf muscle	Adult-onset	Fatty infiltration of calf muscles (pseudohypertrophy) and myofibrosis.
Endocrine myopathies	Acromegaly/Gigantism	General		Muscle hypertrophy
Metabolic myopathies	Late-onset Pompe disease (Glycogen storage disease type II) (formerly, LGMD2V)	Calf muscle/macroglossia	Variable (childhood to adulthood, but not infantile-onset)	Calf muscle hypertrophy, abnormal glycogen accumulation within the lysosomes of muscle cells due to impaired glycogenolysis. Macroglossia (enlarged tongue) due to infiltration of fat, or very rarely a benign tumour (pseudohypertrophy). The fatty tissue is seen on MRI as "bright tongue sign."
Metabolic myopathies	Cori/Forbes disease (Glycogen storage disease type III)	Sternocleidomastoid, trapezius and quadriceps muscles/thigh muscles	Variable	Hypertrophy and pseudohypertrophy. Abnormal glycogen accumulation within the cytosol of muscle cells due to impaired glycogenolysis.
Metabolic myopathies	McArdle disease (Glycogen storage disease type V)	Calf muscle /quadriceps /deltoid and bicep muscles	Childhood-onset	Muscle hypertrophy, lean calf muscles, abnormal glycogen accumulation within the cytosol of muscle cells due to impaired glycogenolysis. EMG normal or myopathic low amplitude, short duration polyphasic MUAPs (motor unit action potentials). EMG results may be dynamic: more likely to be myopathic after 5 minutes of high-intensity isometric exercise.
Metabolic myopathies	Muscle glycogen storage disease of unknown etiology in conjunction with dystrophin gene deletion	Calf muscle	Adult-onset (30s)	Calf muscle hypertrophy. Muscle biopsy showed abnormal glycogen accumulation, without dystrophic changes. Histochemical studies were negative for any known disorder of glycogen metabolism. Atrophy of quadriceps (thigh) muscles and hip abductors. EMG showed myopathic changes in the legs, most prominent in the thighs and minimal changes in the arms. Predominance of type IIA (fast-twitch/oxidative) muscle fibres, deficiency of type I (slow-twitch/oxidative) and type IIB muscle fibres (fast-twitch/glycolytic). Histochemistry showed normal phosphorylase and other enzymes. Biochemical studies showed a phosphorylase activity just below normal range, with other activities being normal. Southern blot analysis revealed a deletion of exons 45 to 48 of dystrophin gene, which on Western blotting was shown to produce normal amounts of truncated dystrophin.
Metabolic myopathies	Hereditary myopathy with lactic acidosis (HML) (gene ISCU)	Calf muscle	Childhood-onset	Some have hypertrophy of calf muscles. Upon palpitation, some feel abnormally hard with or without tenderness. Radiological examination showed no infiltration of fatty tissue. Muscle biopsy showed proliferation of type I (slow-twitch/oxidative) muscle fibres, abnormal mitochondrial iron and lipid deposits. Histochemical studies show deficiency of succinate dehydrogenase and aconitase, defective oxidative phosphorylation. Some showed evidence of necrosis and regeneration. EMG is normal or myopathic increased polyphasic MUAPs. EMG results may be dynamic: more likely to have increased polyphasic MUAPs after exercise.
Metabolic myopathies	Muscular dystrophy, limb-girdle, type 1H (As of 2017 was excluded from LGMD, but not yet assigned new nomenclature)	Calf muscle	Variable (teens-50s)	Muscle hypertrophy, muscle fibre type variation, ragged red fibres, absence of cytochrome c oxidase staining, evidence of mtDNA deletions, defective oxidative phosphorylation suggestive of mitochondrial myopathy.
Malnutrition (poor diet, malabsorption diseases, or drug side effect such as lipase inhibitor Orlistat)	Vitamin D deficiency myopathy (also known as osteomalacic myopathy)	Calf muscle	Adult-onset (no rickets)	Muscle hypertrophy in rare cases. Commonly abnormal glycogen accumulation (impaired glycogenolysis), atrophy of type II (fast-twitch/glycolytic) muscle fibres, enlarged inter-fibrillar spaces; rarely infiltration of fat (pseudohypertrophy), and fibrosis. EMG myopathic low amplitude, short duration polyphasic MUAPs (motor unit action potentials).
Malnutrition (poor diet, malabsorption diseases, or drug side effect such as lipase inhibitor Orlistat)	Vitamin D deficiency myopathy secondary to Celiac disease	Calf muscle	Adult-onset (no rickets)	
Congenital myopathies	Central core disease Congenital myopathy 1 A & B, Malignant hyperthermia susceptibility (RYR1 gene)	Calf muscle		Muscle hypertrophy
Congenital myopathies	Centronuclear myopathy Types 1, 2, & 6	Calf muscle /paraspinal muscles/ general	Variable. Childhood- to adult-onset	Muscle hypertrophy. Muscle biopsy shows numerous centrally located nuclei, and may have other variable myopathic features.
Congenital myopathies	Congenital myopathy 5 with cardiomyopathy (CMYP5)	Calf muscle	Infantile-onset	Hypertrophic calf muscles. Biopsy shows centralized nuclei, type I (slow-twitch/oxidative) fibre predominance, mini core-like lesions with mitochondrial depletion and sarcomeric disorganization. Dystrophic changes more apparent in second decade.
Congenital myopathies	Congenital myopathy 9B, proximal, with minicore lesions	Calf muscle	Infantile-onset	Pseudohypertrophy due to fatty infiltration. Biopsy shows type I (slow-twitch/oxidative) fibre predominance, increased internal nuclei, Z-band streaming, and minicores that disrupt the myofibrillar striation pattern.
Congenital myopathies	Congenital myopathy 24 (CMYP24) (formerly, nemaline myopathy 11, autosomal recessive)	Calf muscle	Childhood-onset	Calf muscle pseudohypertrophy. Biopsy shows fibre size variation, type I (slow-twitch/oxidative) fibre predominance, cytoplasmic and intranuclear nemaline bodies. MRI shows fatty infiltration of tongue, back, thigh and calf muscles. EMG shows chronic denervation and myopathy.
Congenital myopathies	Tubular aggregate myopathy types 1 & 2 (genes STIM1, ORAI1)	Calf muscle	Typically childhood-onset	Hypertrophy of type I and type II muscle fibres, type I (slow-twitch/oxidative) fibre predominance, fatty infiltration of affected muscles, tubular aggregates (TAs) mainly in type I fibres arranged in honeycomb-like structures (transversal sections) or aligned in parallel (longitudinal sections), internal nuclei, particulate glycogen scattered between tightly packed tubules, occasional lipofuscin granules within large TAs, EMG normal to myopathic. Muscle oedema and fibrosis may accompany fatty infiltration.
Myosin myopathies and Laing distal myopathy (gene MYH7)	Laing distal myopathy (Myopathy, distal, 1; MPD1)	Calf muscle	Variable. Typically childhood-onset	Wide phenotypic variability. Typically hypertrophic calf muscles, atrophy of anterior compartment tibial muscles, predominance of type I fibres and numerous small type I fibres. Common are internal nuclei, structural abnormalities (especially minicores), and mitochondrial abnormalities (ragged red fibres). Rarely muscle necrosis, protein aggregates, rimmed vacuoles, filamentous inclusions, muscle atrophy with fat or connective tissue replacement (pseudohypertrophy), cytoplasmic bodies, and myofibrillar alterations. EMG myopathic or neurogenic.
Myosin myopathies and Laing distal myopathy (gene MYH7)	Myosin storage myopathy (Congenital myopathy 7A, myosin storage; CMYP7A)	Calf muscle	Variable. Typically childhood-onset	Wide phenotypic variability. Typically fatty infiltration of calf muscles (pseudohypertrophy), type I (slow-twitch/oxidative) fibre predominance, type I fibres have abnormalities (hyaline bodies and myosin protein aggregates), and generalized muscle atrophy. Other variable muscle biopsy findings may be seen in addition. EMG is myopathic.
Tumours	Infiltrating lipoma	Calf muscle		Pseudohypertrophy
Tumours	Sarcoma			Pseudohypertrophy
Vascular	Intramuscular hematoma due to inherited or acquired coagulopathy			Muscle swollen due to intramuscular bleeding and impaired blood clotting.
Vascular	Diabetic muscle infarction	Quadriceps	Adult-onset	Commonly in the thigh (quadriceps). Short-term, painful swelling of the muscle that is firm and warm to the touch. Muscle biopsy shows necrosis and oedema.
Vascular	Compartment syndrome (Acute or chronic exertional)	Calf muscles /general	Adult-onset	Muscle swelling due to increased internal pressure from bleeding and inflammatory reactions. Muscle swelling in chronic exertional compartment syndrome relieves with rest. Acute compartment syndrome due to injury requires surgery.
Short stature	Myhre syndrome (chronic denervation hypertrophy secondary to primary disease)	General	Childhood-onset	Muscle hypertrophy
Short stature	Schwartz-Jampel syndrome		Infantile-onset	Muscle hypertrophy
Short stature	Uruguay faciocardiomusculoskeletal syndrome		Early childhood-onset	Muscle hypertrophy
Short stature	Nivelon-Nivelon-Mabille syndrome		Prenatal-onset	Muscle hypertrophy in some
Short stature	Satoyoshi syndrome	General	Childhood to early adolescence-onset	Muscle hypertrophy
Short stature	Stormorken syndrome (gene STIM1)	Calf muscle	Childhood-onset	Fatty infiltration of affected muscles, tubular aggregates (TAs) mainly in type I (slow-twitch/oxidative) fibres arranged in honeycomb-like structures (transversal sections) or aligned in parallel (longitudinal sections), type I (slow-twitch/oxidative) muscle fibre predominance, internal nuclei,
Exclusively facial muscles	Hemifacial myohyperplasia (HMH)	Unilateral facial expression muscles and/or masticatory muscles	Prenatal-onset	Unilateral (one side of the face) hyperplasia in the muscles controlling facial expression and/or mastication (chewing)
Exclusively facial muscles	Idiopathic unilateral masseter muscle hypertrophy	Masticatory muscles	Adolescence-onset	Unilateral (one side of the face) hypertrophy of masticatory muscles (used for chewing food). Biopsy showed hypertrophic muscle fibres.
Exclusively facial muscles	Masseter muscle hypertrophy	Masticatory muscles	Adolescence-onset	Bilateral (both sides of the face) muscle hypertrophy of the masticatory muscles (used for chewing food)
Exclusively facial muscles	Bruxism (excessive teeth grinding or clenching)	Masticatory muscles		Hypertrophy of masticatory muscles (used for chewing food)
Other	Syringomyelia (cyst or cavity within spinal cord)	Upper limbs /calf muscle		Muscle hypertrophy
Other	Peripheral nerve hyperexcitability syndromes (Neuromyotonia, Morvan syndrome, Benign fasciculation syndrome, Cramp fasciculation syndrome)	Upper limbs /calf muscle		Muscle hypertrophy
Other	Episodic ataxia, type 1 (EA1) (Episodic ataxia with myokymia; EAM) (Potassium channelopathy, gene KCNA1)	Calf muscle	Childhood-onset	Calf muscle hypertrophy. EMG shows polyphasic continuous motor unit discharges. Muscle biopsy shows enlargement of type I muscle fibres, consistent with denervation.
Other	Myasthenic syndrome, congenital, 23, presynaptic (CMS23)	Calf muscle	Infantile-onset	Calf muscle hypertrophy. EMG shows abnormal jitter. Biopsy normal or non-specific myopathic features.
Other	Familial myoedema, muscular hypertrophy and stiffness	Calf muscle	Childhood-onset	Calf muscle hypertrophy Muscle biopsy showed unspecified myopathic changes, many vacuoles between myofibrils. EMG showed no myopathic discharges. Myoedema response in whole body.
Other	Strongman syndrome (Muscle hypertrophy syndrome, myalgic)	General	Childhood-onset	Muscle hypertrophy
Other	Hypertrophia musculorum vera (Latin for true muscle hypertrophy)	Calf muscle /masseter muscle	Variable. Typically adult-onset (early 20s)	Calf muscle hypertrophy, there may also be hypertrophy of masseter muscles (used for chewing food). Biopsy of affected muscles shows hypertrophy of muscle fibres with occasional central migration of sarcolemmal nuclei. EMG of affected muscles is myopathic.
Other	TANGO2-related disease (Metabolic crises, recurrent, with rhabdomyolysis, cardiac arrhythmias, and neurodegeneration; MECRCN)	Hemihypertrophy of arm and leg	Infantile-onset	Wide phenotypic variability. Hemihypertrophy of right arm and leg (rare). Abnormal autophagy and mitophagy, may have normal or abnormal secondary fatty acid metabolism and/or respiratory chain dysfunction in muscle biopsy.
Other	Atypical Werner syndrome	Limbs	Variable. Adolescence- or early adult-onset	Muscle hypertrophy of the limbs
Other	Dilated cardiomyopathy 1X (CMD1X)	Calf muscle		Bilateral calf muscle hypertrophy
Other	Chromosome Xp21 deletion syndrome	Calf muscle	Childhood-onset	Bilateral calf muscle hypertrophy
Other	Neuromuscular oculoauditory syndrome (NMOAS)	Calf muscle		
Other	Myopathy with extrapyramidal signs (MPXPS)	Calf muscle		
Other	Habitual toe walking secondary to autism spectrum disorder	Calf muscle	Childhood-onset	Muscle hypertrophy

=== Skin and other non-muscle tissue ===
Disease grouping	Disease	Body part(s) typically affected	Age of onset	Biopsy, ultrasonography, CT scan or MRI
Lipomatosis	Madelung disease	Upper trunk	Adult-onset	Symmetrical subcutaneous adipose tissue (unencapsulated lipomas)
Parasitic	Disseminated cysticercosis	Skin/General	Variable	Pork tapeworm cysts
Inflammation of the joint	Amyloidosis	shoulders "shoulder pad sign"	Adult-onset	Amyloid deposits, significant thickening of the subdeltoid bursa
Synovial fluid leak	Burst Baker's cyst	Calf	Adult-onset	Swelling of the calf due to synovial fluid leaking into it from a burst Baker's cyst.
Phlebetic lymphedema	Venous thrombosis/ Post-thrombotic syndrome	Lower extremities	Adult-onset	Swelling of the legs with discolouration of the skin (darkening or reddening) due to a blood clot in a deep vein and subsequent swelling of lymphatic system.
Phlebetic lymphedema	Chronic venous insufficiency	Lower extremities	Adult-onset	Swelling of the legs, with possible discolouration of the skin (darkening or reddening). Swelling and discolouration is most prominent towards the direction of gravity (foot/ankle when standing). Depending on severity, the calf and thigh may appear swollen. Skin conditions can develop such as venous ulcers, lipodermatosclerosis, and stasis dermatitis.

== See also ==
- Hyperplasia
- Muscle hypertrophy
- Pseudohypertrophy
- Shoulder pad sign
