= Infant hercules syndrome =

Infant hercules syndrome may refer to:

- Kocher–Debré–Semelaigne syndrome
- Adrenogenital syndrome
- Myostatin mutation resulting in hypertrophy and increased strength
