= Hysterical strength =

Incredible human strength that occurs in extreme or dangerous situations

Hysterical strength is a display of extreme physical strength by humans, beyond what is believed to be within their capacity, usually occurring when people are in—or perceive themselves, or others, to be in—life-or-death situations. It was also reported to be present during situations of altered states of consciousness, such as trance and alleged possession. Its description is mostly based on anecdotal evidence.

The name refers to hysteria, a nosological category that included bouts of superhuman strength as one of the possible symptoms. In Europe, this had previously been considered a symptom of demonic possession, which was treated by the Catholic ritual of exorcism. Early neurologist Jean-Martin Charcot ascribed such displays of unusual physical prowess instead to his proposed second phase of hysteria, which he called clownism. Thus, the phenomenon began at that time to be addressed by the investigation of insanity, rather than supernatural causes. During that period in the 19th century, the term hysterical strength could also be found in the intersection of such fields, scientific and religious, for instance mentioned by the Society for Psychical Research regarding a statement given by a physician.

It was also described in reports of trance or possession in several other cultures, as for example in the New Testament (Mark 5:4) or in shamanic practices.

Unexpected strength is claimed to occur during the now widely rejected pseudoscientific condition of excited delirium.

== Examples ==
The most common anecdotal examples based on hearsay are of parents lifting vehicles to rescue their children, and when people are in life-and-death situations. Periods of increased strength are short-lived, usually no longer than a few minutes, and might lead to muscle injuries and exhaustion later. It is not known if there are any reliable examples of this phenomenon.

- Seyit Çabuk, an Ottoman Army gunner in World War I, became famous for carrying three bombshells that weighed 276 kg (608 lb) to an artillery piece while in battle. Later, he was photographed with the bombshell but could not move it. "If war breaks out again, I'll lift it again," he said.
- Tibetan oracles, such as the Nechung Kuten or Sungma Balung, are reported to display superhuman strength during possession. Eyewitnesses described the Nechung Oracle wearing a 36 kg (80 lb) or 41 kg (90 lb) headdress, that normally outside the trance could break his neck. The 14th Dalai Lama also stated that the oracle could barely walk with the total weight of his 32 kg (70 lb) outfit when not in trance.
- Comic book artist Jack Kirby claimed he was inspired to create the Hulk after seeing a woman lift a car to save her baby in 1962. This story would actually make its way to the 1978 television series pilot, where Banner and his associates are interviewing the woman in question as well as her son, who were portrayed by actors for the scene, where her name was changed to "Mrs. Maier."
- In 1982, in Lawrenceville, Georgia, Tony Cavallo was repairing a 1,692 kg (3,730 lb) 1964 Chevrolet Impala automobile from underneath when the vehicle fell off the jacks on which it was propped, trapping him underneath. Cavallo's mother, Angela Cavallo, lifted the car high enough and long enough for two neighbors to replace the jacks and pull Tony from beneath the car.
- Shortly after filming Magnum, P.I., the show's helicopter stunt coordinator crashed a Hughes 500D helicopter in Waialua, Hawaii while flying another job. He was pinned in the cockpit as it lay partially submerged in water and was freed when Warren "Tiny" Everal heroically lifted the front of the 640 kg (1,400 lb) chopper, allowing his rescue.
- In 2006, Lydia Angiyou confronted a polar bear after it threatened her 7-year-old son and his friends as they played hockey in Ivujivik, Quebec, until a hunter could return with a rifle.
- In 2006, in Tucson, Arizona, Tom Boyle watched as a Chevrolet Camaro hit 18-year-old Kyle Holtrust. The car pinned Holtrust, still alive, underneath. Boyle lifted the Camaro off the teenager, while the driver of the car pulled the teen to safety.
- In 2009, in Ottawa, Kansas, 1.70 m (5 ft 7 in), 84 kg (185 lb) Nick Harris lifted a Mercury sedan to help a 6-year-old girl pinned beneath.
- In 2009, in Newport, Wales, Donna McNamee, Abigail Sicolo, and Anthony McNamee lifted a 1,150 kg (2,540 lb) Renault Clio off an 8-year-old boy.
- In 2011, Danous Estenor, an offensive lineman on University of South Florida's football team, lifted a Cadillac Seville weighing 1,600 kg (3,500 lb) off a tow truck driver who wriggled out from under the rear tire, largely unharmed due to the rapid rescue. He had gotten pinned when the car rolled off his tow truck. Estenor then continued walking to the cafeteria. It did not occur to him to share the story widely and only mentioned it to his roommate and parents, and a flurry of press picked it up well afterwards.
- In 2012, in Glen Allen, Virginia, 22-year-old Lauren Kornacki rescued her father, Alec Kornacki, after the jack used to prop up his BMW automobile slipped, pinning him under it. Lauren lifted the car, then performed CPR on her father and saved his life.
- In 2012, in Monroe, Michigan, Austin Smith (age 15) lifted a 1,285 kg (2,833 lb) automobile (a 1991 Buick Century) to save his grandfather pinned underneath.
- In 2013, in Oregon, teenage sisters Hannah (age 16) and Haylee (age 14) lifted a 1,400 kg (3,000 lb) tractor to save their father pinned underneath.
- In 2013, in Salvage, Newfoundland and Labrador, Cecil Stuckless, a 72-year-old man, lifted a Jeep SUV to save his son-in-law pinned underneath.
- In 2014, Bob Renning, a 52-year-old man in New Brighton, Minnesota rushed to a burning Chevrolet Trailblazer on the side of the highway and rescued its frantic driver, who was impossible to see through the smoke. Renning gripped one of the door frames with his fingers and bent it in half to form an exit. He had "no idea" how he did it and was pleased that his grandkids were impressed.
- In 2015, St. John's, Newfoundland resident Nick Williams witnessed a four-wheel drive vehicle run over a young boy who had been playing on the sidewalk, pinning the child under a tire. Williams lifted the car off the boy, who did not have serious injuries. Recalling the moment, Williams said: "I couldn't budge it at first, but then I saw the little fellow ... and the bugger came up then."
- In 2016, Vienna, Virginia teenager Charlotte Heffelmire lifted a burning truck off her father in her family home's attached garage before driving the flaming truck into the yard on three wheels. "I didn't want the house to explode with the truck" she explained. Heffelmire closed the garage door to contain flames, called 911, then entered the smoke-filled home to get her family out from the ensuing house fire. She later said, "I just did what I had to do, so I don't feel like a big hero or anything."
- In 2017, in Temple Terrace, Florida, Kenny Franklin lifted an SUV from a state trooper after an accident.
- In 2019 in Cleveland, Ohio, 16-year-old American football player Zac Clark lifted a 1,400 kg (3,000 lb) Volkswagen Passat off his 39-year-old neighbor after hearing a cry for help. Clark said he thought about his deceased father in that moment, and did not want another family to experience such a loss. The teen's football coach was "amazed but not surprised".

== Research ==
Early experiments showed that adrenaline increases twitch, but not tetanic force and rate of force development in muscles.

One proposed explanation is Tim Noakes' "central governor" theory, which states that higher instances in the central nervous system dynamically and subconsciously control the number of active motor units in the muscle. Normally, in order to guarantee homeostasis, the entire motor neural capacity is not activated and, therefore, the total capacity of the muscle during performances outside of an emergency situation remains inaccessible: this would lead to exhaustion of energy resources and even physical injuries. However, in life-threatening situations, it is adaptive for the central governor limits to be removed or modified. People in high load weightlifting training are able to activate more motor units, which ensures more strength and efficiency in muscle contraction, even though they had the same amount of muscle mass compared to people in low load training.

Exercise physiologist Robert Girandola has pointed out that most cars have a 60/40 weight distribution, as the engine block puts the center of mass slightly towards the front of the car. In most instances, the individual is lifting one or two wheels of the car from the back. Therefore, they are only actually lifting a small fraction of the vehicle's weight. While the fight or flight response allows for increased lifting capacity, it would be hundreds of pounds rather than thousands.

== See also ==
- Berserker
- Double-muscle mutation in humans
- Myostatin-related muscle hypertrophy, a rare genetic condition resulting in increased musculature and decreased body fat
- Muscle hypertrophy
- Superhuman strength, similar concept in comic books and other fictional works
- Physical strength
