= Cross education =

Cross education is a neurophysiological phenomenon where an increase in strength is witnessed within an untrained limb following unilateral strength training in the opposite, contralateral limb.

Cross education can also be seen in the transfer of skills from one limb to the other.

== Examples ==
A resistance trainer witnesses strength gains in her left and right biceps after participating in a strength training program for only her right biceps. This phenomenon is due to factors at the muscular, spinal and neural levels.

A basketball player learns to dribble a basketball with his right hand and then successfully performs the task with his left hand even though he had undergone no previous training with his left side.
