= Strength training =

Exercise to improve strength

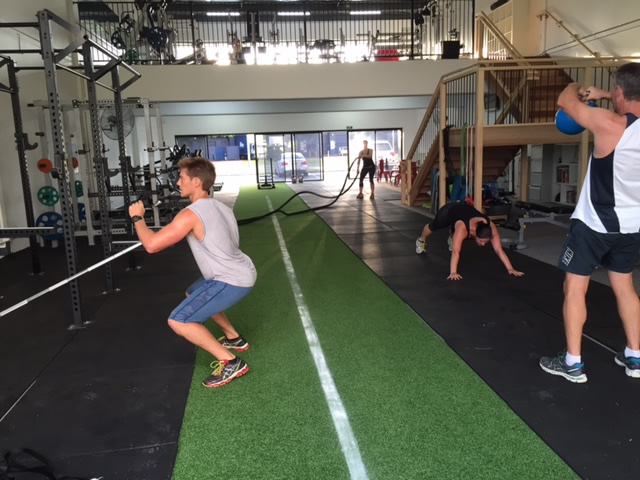
A gym where various forms of strength training are being practiced. From left: overhead presses, battle ropes, planking, and kettlebell raises.

Strength training, also known as weight training or resistance training, is exercise designed to improve physical strength. It may involve lifting weights, bodyweight exercises (such as push-ups, pull-ups, and squats), isometrics (holding a position under tension, such as planks), and plyometrics (explosive movements like jump squats and box jumps).

Training works by progressively increasing the force output of the muscles and uses a variety of exercises and types of equipment. Strength training is primarily an anaerobic activity, although circuit training also is a form of aerobic exercise.

Strength training can increase muscle, tendon, and ligament strength as well as bone density, metabolism, and the lactate threshold; improve joint and cardiac function; and reduce the risk of injury in athletes and the elderly. For many sports and physical activities, strength training is central or is used as part of their training regimen.

== Principles and training methods ==
Strength training follows the fundamental principle that involves repeatedly exercising a muscle group. This is typically done by contracting the muscles during an exercise and then returning to the starting position. This process may be repeated for several repetitions until the muscles reach the point of failure. Strength training typically follows the principle of progressive overload, in which muscles are subjected to gradually increasing resistance over time to stimulate adaptation and growth. They respond by growing larger and stronger. People who are beginning strength training are in the process of training the neurological aspects of strength, including the ability of the brain to generate a rate of neuronal action potentials that will produce a muscular contraction that is close to the maximum of the muscle's potential.

=== Repetitions and sets ===
In strength training, an exercise is commonly performed several times in a row. Each performance is known as a repetition. Two or more repetitions make a set. For each repetition, a person moves through one or more stages of movement. This may involve an eccentric phase where a muscle lengthens, and a concentric phase where it shortens. Each phase is preceded by a preparatory and preloading phase, and followed by a recovery phase. For example, someone doing a press up exercise will position themselves on their hands and feet with their body straight. They then begin a repetition: they prepare to lower themselves, then they bend their arms and lower themselves (called the eccentric phase due to the lengthening of the triceps), they then stop themselves close to the floor and recover their energy- the recovery may be very briefly performed or may take longer depending on how tired they are. They then prepare to raise themselves making whatever adjustments to their position as they feel are needed and preloading themselves in terms of energy, they then straighten their arms and raise themselves (the concentric phase), and at the top of the movement they stop and recover- the recovery in this position is significantly greater than in the lower position. The repetition cycle is then repeated beginning with a new preparatory phase. For different exercises the cycle may alter but will always contain preparatory and recovery phases.

Sets may also be performed multiple times with rest periods between them. For example, the pattern may be 10 press ups, then two minutes rest, 10 press ups, then two minutes rest etc.

The ability to recover during an exercise (active recovery), during a training session, and resting between training sessions are all of fundamental importance in strength training. If recovery cannot take place then fatigue may occur leading to worse performance and an increased chance of injury.

=== Proper form ===
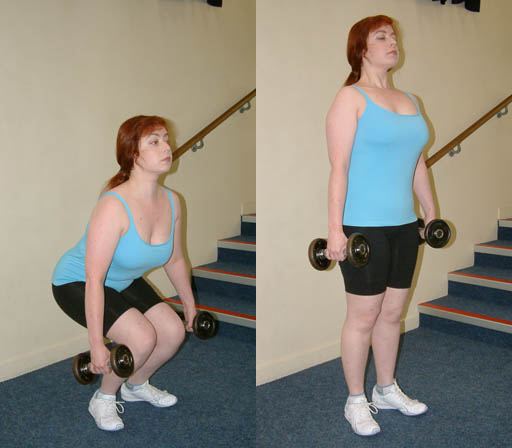
A dumbbell half-squat.

Strength training also requires the use of proper or 'good form', performing the movements with the appropriate muscle group, and not transferring the weight to different body parts in order to move greater weight (called 'cheating'). An injury or an inability to reach training objectives might arise from poor form during a training set. If the desired muscle group is not challenged sufficiently, the threshold of overload is never reached and the muscle does not gain in strength. At a particularly advanced level, however, "cheating" can be used to break through strength plateaus and encourage neurological and muscular adaptation.

Maintaining proper form is one of the many steps in order to perfectly perform a certain strength training technique. Correct form in weight training improves strength, muscle tone, and maintaining a healthy weight. Improper form can lead to strains and fractures.

=== Stretching and warm-up ===
Weight trainers often spend time warming up before starting their workout, a practice strongly recommended by the National Strength and Conditioning Association (NSCA). A warm-up may include cardiovascular activity such as light stationary biking (a "pulse raiser"), flexibility and joint mobility exercises, static and/or dynamic stretching, "passive warm up" such as applying heat pads or taking a hot shower, and workout-specific warm-up, such as rehearsal of the intended exercise with no weights or light weights. The intended purpose of warming up is to enhance exercise effectiveness and reduce the risk of injury.

Evidence is limited regarding whether warming up reduces injuries during strength training. As of 2015, no articles existed on the effects of warm-up for upper body injury prevention. For the lower limbs, several programs significantly reduce injuries in sports and military training, but no universal injury prevention program has emerged, and it is unclear if warm-ups designed for these areas will also be applicable to strength training. Static stretching can increase the risk of injury due to its analgesic effect and cellular damage caused by it.

The effects of warming up on exercise effectiveness are clearer. For 1RM (One-repetition maximum) trials, an exercise rehearsal has significant benefits. For submaximal strength training (3 sets of 80% of 1RM to failure), exercise rehearsal does not provide any benefits regarding fatigue or total repetitions for exercises such as bench press, squats, and arm curl, compared to no warm-up. Dynamic warm-ups (performed with greater than 20% of maximal effort) enhance strength and power in upper-body exercises. When properly warmed up the lifter will have more strength and stamina since the blood has begun to flow to the muscle groups. Pulse raisers do not have any effect on either 1RM or submaximal training. Static stretching induces strength loss, and should therefore probably not be performed before strength training. Resistance training functions as an active form of flexibility training, with similar increases in range of motion when compared to performing a static stretching protocol. Static stretching, performed either before or after exercise, also does not reduce muscle soreness in healthy adults.

=== Breathing ===
Like numerous forms of exercise, weight training has the potential to cause the breathing pattern to deepen. This helps to meet increased oxygen requirements. One approach to breathing during weight training consists of avoiding holding one's breath and breathing deeply. The benefits of this include protecting against a lack of oxygen, passing out, and increased blood pressure. The general procedure of this method is to inhale when lowering the weight (the eccentric portion) and exhale when lifting the weight (the concentric portion). However, the reverse, inhaling when lifting and exhaling when lowering, may also be recommended. There is little difference between the two techniques in terms of their influence on heart rate and blood pressure.

On the other hand, for people working with extremely heavy loads (such as powerlifters), the Valsalva maneuver is often used. This involves deeply inhaling and then bracing down with the abdominal and lower back muscles as the air is held in during the entire rep. Air is then expelled once the rep is done, or after a number of reps is done. The Valsalva maneuver leads to an increase in intrathoracic and intra-abdominal pressure. This enhances the structural integrity of the torso—protecting against excessive spinal flexion or extension and providing a secure base to lift heavy weights effectively and securely. However, as the Valsalva maneuver increases blood pressure, lowers heart rate, and restricts breathing, it can be a dangerous method for those with hypertension or for those who faint easily.

=== Training volume ===
Training volume is commonly defined as sets × reps × load. That is, an individual moves a certain load for some number of repetitions, rests, and repeats this for some number of sets, and the volume is the product of these numbers. For non-weightlifting exercises, the load may be replaced with intensity, the amount of work required to achieve the activity. Training volume is one of the most critical variables in the effectiveness of strength training. There is a positive relationship between volume and hypertrophy.

The load or intensity is often normalized as the percentage of an individual's one-repetition maximum (1RM). Due to muscle failure, the intensity limits the maximum number of repetitions that can be carried out in one set, and is correlated with the repetition ranges chosen. Depending on the goal, different loads and repetition amounts may be appropriate:

- Strength development (1RM performance): Gains may be achieved with a variety of loads. However, training efficiency is maximized by using heavy loads (80% to 100% of 1RM). The number of repetitions is secondary and may be 1 to 5 repetitions per set.
- Muscle growth (hypertrophy): Hypertrophy can be maximized by taking sets to failure or close to failure. Any load 30% of 1RM or greater may be used. The NCSA recommends "medium" loads of 8 to 12 repetitions per set with 60% to 80% of 1RM.
- Endurance: Endurance may be trained by performing many repetitions, such as 15 or more per set. The NCSA recommends "light" loads below 60% of 1RM, but some studies have found conflicting results suggesting that "moderate" 15-20RM loads may work better when performed to failure.

Training to muscle failure is not necessary for increasing muscle strength and muscle mass, but you must get within two to three reps of failure to see proper results.

=== Movement tempo ===
The speed or pace at which each repetition is performed is also an important factor in strength and muscle gain. The emerging format for expressing this is as a 4-number tempo code such as 3/1/4/2, meaning an eccentric phase lasting 3 seconds, a pause of 1 second, a concentric phase of 4 seconds, and another pause of 2 seconds. The letter X in a tempo code represents a voluntary explosive action whereby the actual velocity and duration is not controlled and may be involuntarily extended as fatigue manifests, while the letter V implies volitional freedom "at your own pace". A phase's tempo may also be measured as the average movement velocity. Less precise but commonly used characterizations of tempo include the total time for the repetition or a qualitative characterization such as fast, moderate, or slow. The ACSM recommends a moderate or slower tempo of movement for novice- and intermediate-trained individuals, but a combination of slow, moderate, and fast tempos for advanced training.

Intentionally slowing down the movement tempo of each repetition can increase muscle activation for a given number of repetitions. However, the maximum number of repetitions and the maximum possible load for a given number of repetitions decreases as the tempo is slowed. Some trainers calculate training volume using the time under tension (TUT), namely the time of each rep times the number of reps, rather than simply the number of reps. However, hypertrophy is similar for a fixed number of repetitions and each repetition's duration varying from 0.5 s - 8 s. There is however a marked decrease in hypertrophy for "very slow" durations greater than 10 s. There are similar hypertrophic effects for 50-60% 1RM loads with a slower 3/0/3/0 tempo and 80-90% 1RM loads with a faster 1/1/1/0 tempo. It may be beneficial for both hypertrophy and strength to use fast, short concentric phases and slower, longer eccentric phases. Research has not yet isolated the effects of concentric and eccentric durations, or tested a wide variety of exercises and populations.

=== Weekly frequency ===
In general, more weekly training sessions lead to higher increases in physical strength. However, when training volume was equalized, training frequency had no influence on muscular strength. In addition, greater frequency had no significant effect on single-joint exercises. There may be a fatigue recovery effect in which spreading the same amount of training over multiple days boosts strength gains, but this has to be confirmed by future studies.

For muscle growth, a training frequency of two sessions per week had greater effects than once per week. Whether training a muscle group three times per week is superior to a twice-per-week protocol remains to be determined.

=== Rest period ===
The rest period is defined as the time dedicated to recovery between sets and exercises. Exercise causes metabolic stress, such as the buildup of lactic acid and the depletion of adenosine triphosphate and phosphocreatine. Resting 3–5 minutes between sets allows for significantly greater repetitions in the next set versus resting 1–2 minutes.

For untrained individuals (no previous resistance training experience), the effect of resting on muscular strength development is small and other factors such as volitional fatigue and discomfort, cardiac stress, and the time available for training may be more important. Moderate rest intervals (60-160s) are better than short (20-40 s), but long rest intervals (3–4 minutes) have no significant difference from moderate.

For trained individuals, rest of 3–5 minutes is sufficient to maximize strength gain, compared to shorter intervals 20s-60s and longer intervals of 5 minutes. Intervals of greater than 5 minutes have not been studied. Starting at 2 minutes and progressively decreasing the rest interval over the course of a few weeks to 30s can produce similar strength gains to a constant 2 minutes.

Regarding older individuals, a 1-minute rest is sufficient in females.

=== Order ===
The largest increases in strength happen for the exercises in the beginning of a session.

Supersets are defined as a pair of different exercise sets performed without rest, followed by a normal rest period. Common superset configurations are two exercises for the same muscle group, agonist-antagonist muscles, or alternating upper and lower body muscle groups. Exercises for the same muscle group (flat bench press followed by the incline bench press) result in a significantly lower training volume than a traditional exercise format with rests. However, agonist–antagonist supersets result in a significantly higher training volume when compared to a traditional exercise format. Similarly, holding training volume constant but performing upper–lower body supersets and tri-sets reduce elapsed time but increased perceived exertion rate. These results suggest that specific exercise orders may allow more intense, more time-efficient workouts with results similar to longer workouts.

=== Periodization ===
Periodization refers to the organization of training into sequential phases and cyclical periods, and the change in training over time. The simplest strength training periodization involves keeping a fixed schedule of sets and reps (e.g. 2 sets of 12 reps of bicep curls every 2 days), and steadily increasing the intensity on a weekly basis. This is conceptually a parallel model, as several exercises are done each day and thus multiple muscles are developed simultaneously. It is also sometimes called linear periodization, but this designation is considered a misnomer.

Sequential or block periodization concentrates training into periods ("blocks"). For example, for athletes, performance can be optimized for specific events based on the competition schedule. An annual training plan may be divided hierarchically into several levels, from training phases down to individual sessions. Traditional periodization can be viewed as repeating one weekly block over and over. Block periodization has the advantage of focusing on specific motor abilities and muscle groups. Because only a few abilities are worked on at a time, the effects of fatigue are minimized. With careful goal selection and ordering, there may be synergistic effects. A traditional block consists of high-volume, low-intensity exercises, transitioning to low-volume, high-intensity exercises. However, to maximize progress to specific goals, individual programs may require different manipulations, such as decreasing the intensity and increasing volume.

Undulating periodization is an extension of block periodization to frequent changes in volume and intensity, usually daily or weekly. Because of the rapid changes, it is theorized that there will be more stress on the neuromuscular system and better training effects. Undulating periodization yields better strength improvements on 1RM than non-periodized training. For hypertrophy, it appears that daily undulating periodization has similar effect to more traditional models.

=== Training splits ===
A training split refers to how the trainee divides and schedules their training volume, or in other words which muscles are trained on a given day over a period of time (usually a week). Popular training splits include full body, upper/lower, push/pull/legs, and the "bro" split. Some training programs may alternate splits weekly.

=== Exercise selection ===
Exercise selection depends on the goals of the strength training program. If a specific sport or activity is targeted, the focus will be on specific muscle groups used in that sport. Various exercises may target improvements in strength, speed, agility, or endurance. For other populations such as older individuals, there is little information to guide exercise selection, but exercises can be selected on the basis of specific functional capabilities as well as the safety and efficiency of the exercises.

For strength and power training in able-bodied individuals, the NSCA recommends emphasizing integrated or compound movements (multi-joint exercises), such as with free weights, over exercises isolating a muscle (single-joint exercises), such as with machines. This is due to the fact that only the compound movements improve gross motor coordination and proprioceptive stabilizing mechanisms. However, single-joint exercises can result in greater muscle growth in the targeted muscles, and are more suitable for injury prevention and rehabilitation. Low variation in exercise selection or targeted muscle groups, combined with a high volume of training, is likely to lead to overtraining and training maladaptation. Many exercises such as the squat have several variations. Some studies have analyzed the differing muscle activation patterns, which can aid in exercise selection.

=== Joint conditioning and injury prevention ===
Strength training typically incorporates strengthening the muscles of the body. This means that the tension of the muscle when at rest will ordinarily be increased. This also influences the length of the muscle in a relationship known as length-tension. This length-tension of the muscle influences the standard position of the joints it connects to via the tendons. If it is too tight or too loose then the respective joints risk being pulled or falling out of their optimum position which is known as being centrated (centered). The optimum positioning of a joint is gained and maintained by the muscles which influence it, including the agonists and antagonists, being of the correct length-tension and in the appropriate balance of strength with each other. In turn, the optimum joint position means that the muscles length-tension is regulated more efficiently with greater levels of control.

Due to this reciprocal relationship between the muscles and joints, strength training programmes seek to ensure that the muscles are not strengthened in an excessive and disharmonious way which will lead to poor joint alignment (decentration). Where poor joint alignment does occur the amount of force the muscles can apply is reduced, movement control (agility) is reduced, and injury risk is increased especially in regard to wear and tear injuries.

Forms of exercise which seek to specifically improve joint alignment, and thereby increase joint stability and flexibility, include those which emphasise balance and proprioception e.g. standing on one bent leg and looking around the room, full range of motion e.g. an overhead press weight training exercise, and isometric exercises e.g. maintaining a Pilates pose. There is a strong focus on ensuring that the correct posture of the body and movement form for the exercise is achieved in order that the position of the joints is optimised throughout.

There is ongoing debate about the effect of lifting heavy weights on the joints with some researchers arguing that this weakens the joints in the long term, especially in regard to ranges of movement which involve extreme ranges of flexion or extension i.e. a deep squat. Conversely, there are also proponents who argue that it strengthens the joints. Due to the greater possibility for heavy weight training to alter the position and alignment of the joints, powerlifters and body builders perform exercises for the stabilising muscles in order to keep the joints optimally positioned and aligned in their sockets. For example, they strengthen the rotator cuff muscles in order that the top of the humerus remains centrated in the glenoid fossa.

Improved joint conditioning can also be achieved via a conscious attempt to regulate them, through a sense of self-awareness, so that they are aligned and positioned more optimally both when static and during movement. The focus on achieving this as a part of everyday life is ordinarily incorporated into the greater ambition of achieving good posture. Where this has been lost and poor posture is present, there are also therapeutic postural re-education techniques which are designed to regain it.

=== Equipment ===
Commonly used equipment for resistance training include free weights—including dumbbells, barbells, and kettlebells—weight machines, and resistance bands.

Resistance can also be generated by inertia in flywheel training instead of by gravity from weights, facilitating variable resistance throughout the range of motion and eccentric overload.

Some bodyweight exercises do not require any equipment, and others may be performed with equipment such as suspension trainers or pull-up bars.

=== Types of strength training exercises ===
- Isometric exercise
- Isotonic exercise
- Isokinetic exercise

== Aerobic exercise versus anaerobic exercise ==
Strength training exercise is primarily anaerobic. Even while training at a lower intensity (training loads of ≈20-RM), anaerobic glycolysis is still the major source of power, although aerobic metabolism makes a small contribution. Weight training is commonly perceived as anaerobic exercise, because one of the more common goals is to increase strength by lifting heavy weights. Other goals such as rehabilitation, weight loss, body shaping, and bodybuilding often use lower weights, adding aerobic character to the exercise.

Except in the extremes, a muscle will fire fibres of both the aerobic or anaerobic types on any given exercise, in varying ratio depending on the load on the intensity of the contraction. This is known as the energy system continuum. At higher loads, the muscle will recruit all muscle fibres possible, both anaerobic ("fast-twitch") and aerobic ("slow-twitch"), to generate the most force. However, at maximum load, the anaerobic processes contract so forcefully that the aerobic fibers are completely shut out, and all work is done by the anaerobic processes. Because the anaerobic muscle fibre uses its fuel faster than the blood and intracellular restorative cycles can resupply it, the maximum number of repetitions is limited. In the aerobic regime, the blood and intracellular processes can maintain a supply of fuel and oxygen, and continual repetition of the motion will not cause the muscle to fail.

Circuit weight training is a form of exercise that uses a number of weight training exercise sets separated by short intervals. The cardiovascular effort to recover from each set serves a function similar to an aerobic exercise, but this is not the same as saying that a weight training set is itself an aerobic process.

Strength training is typically associated with the production of lactate, which is a limiting factor of exercise performance. Regular endurance exercise leads to adaptations in skeletal muscle which can prevent lactate levels from rising during strength training. This is mediated via activation of PGC-1alpha which alter the LDH (lactate dehydrogenase) isoenzyme complex composition and decreases the activity of the lactate generating enzyme LDHA, while increasing the activity of the lactate metabolizing enzyme LDHB.

== Nutrition ==
=== Macronutrients ===
Supplementation of protein in the diet of healthy adults increases the size and strength of muscles during prolonged resistance exercise training (RET); protein intakes of greater than 1.62 grams per kilogram of body weight a day did not additionally increase fat–free mass (FFM), muscle size, or strength, in a non-energy restricted context. Older lifters may experience less of an effect from protein supplementation on resistance training.

It is not known how much carbohydrate is necessary to maximize muscle hypertrophy. Strength adaptations may not be hindered by a low-carbohydrate diet.

A light, balanced meal prior to the workout (usually one to two hours beforehand) ensures that adequate energy and amino acids are available for the intense bout of exercise. The type of nutrients consumed affects the response of the body, and nutrient timing whereby protein and carbohydrates are consumed prior to and after workout has a beneficial impact on muscle growth. Water is consumed throughout the course of the workout to prevent poor performance due to dehydration. A protein shake is often consumed immediately following the workout. However, the anabolic window is not particularly narrow and protein can also be consumed before or hours after the exercise with similar effects. Glucose (or another simple sugar) is often consumed as well since this quickly replenishes any glycogen lost during the exercise period. If consuming recovery drink after a workout, to maximize muscle protein anabolism, it is suggested that the recovery drink contain glucose (dextrose), protein (usually whey) hydrolysate containing mainly dipeptides and tripeptides, and leucine.

=== Hydration ===
As with other sports, weight trainers should avoid dehydration throughout the workout by drinking sufficient water. This is particularly true in hot environments, or for those older than 65.

Some athletic trainers advise athletes to drink about 7 imperial fluid ounces (200 mL) every 15 minutes while exercising, and about 80 imperial fluid ounces (2.3 L) throughout the day.

However, a much more accurate determination of how much fluid is necessary can be made by performing appropriate weight measurements before and after a typical exercise session, to determine how much fluid is lost during the workout. The greatest source of fluid loss during exercise is through perspiration, but as long as fluid intake is roughly equivalent to the rate of perspiration, hydration levels will be maintained.

Under most circumstances, sports drinks do not offer a physiological benefit over water during weight training. However, under certain conditions—such as prolonged training sessions lasting over an hour, or when exercising in extremely hot and humid environments—sports drinks containing electrolytes and carbohydrates may help replenish lost salts and provide an energy boost. Ultimately, the ideal hydration approach depends on the individual's training intensity, duration, and personal needs.

Insufficient hydration may cause lethargy, soreness or muscle cramps. The urine of well-hydrated persons should be nearly colorless, while an intense yellow color is normally a sign of insufficient hydration.

=== Supplementation ===
Some weight trainers also take ergogenic aids such as creatine or anabolic steroids to aid muscle growth. In a meta-analysis study that investigated the effects of creatine supplementation on repeated sprint ability, it was discovered that creatine increased body mass and mean power output. The creatine-induced increase in body mass was a result of fluid retention. The increase in mean power output was attributed to creatine's ability to counteract the lack of intramuscular phosphocreatine. Creatine does not have an effect on fatigue or maximum power output.

== Effects ==
The effects of strength training include greater muscular strength, improved muscle tone and appearance, increased endurance, cardiovascular health, and enhanced bone density. These benefits contribute not only to athletic performance but also to long-term health and independence, especially as individuals age. Regular resistance training supports metabolic function, helps regulate body weight, and can improve mental well-being through the release of endorphins.

=== Bones, joints, frailty, posture and in people at risk ===
Strength training also provides functional benefits. Stronger muscles improve posture, provide better support for joints, and reduce the risk of injury from everyday activities.

Progressive resistance training may improve function, quality of life and reduce pain in people at risk of fracture, with rare adverse effects. Weight-bearing exercise also helps to prevent osteoporosis and to improve bone strength in those with osteoporosis. For many people in rehabilitation or with an acquired disability, such as following stroke or orthopaedic surgery, strength training for weak muscles is a key factor to optimise recovery. Consistent exercise can actually strengthen bones and prevent them from getting frail with age.

=== Mortality, longevity, muscle and body composition ===
Engaging in strength training has been linked to a 10–17% reduction in the risk of death from all causes, cardiovascular disease, cancer, diabetes, and lung cancer. Two of its primary effects—muscle growth (hypertrophy) and increased muscular strength—are both associated with improved longevity and lower mortality rates.

Strength training also triggers hormonal changes that may contribute to positive health outcomes. It can help lower both systolic and diastolic blood pressure, and positively influence body composition by decreasing body fat percentage, visceral fat, and fat mass. These changes are particularly beneficial since excess body fat and its distribution are closely linked to insulin resistance and the development of chronic diseases.

=== Neurobiological effects ===
Strength training also leads to various beneficial neurobiological effects – likely including functional brain changes, lower white matter atrophy, neuroplasticity (including some degree of BDNF expression), and white matter-related structural and functional changes in neuroanatomy. Although resistance training has been less studied for its effect on depression than aerobic exercise, it has shown benefits compared to no intervention.

=== Lipid and inflammatory outcomes ===
Moreover, it also promotes decreases in total cholesterol (TC), triglycerides (TG), low-density lipoprotein (LDL), and C-reactive protein (CRP) as well as increases in high-density lipoprotein (HDL) and adiponectin concentrations.

=== Sports performance ===
Stronger muscles improve performance in a variety of sports. Sport-specific training routines are used by many competitors. These often specify that the speed of muscle contraction during weight training should be the same as that of the particular sport. Strength training can substantially prevent sports injuries, increase jump height and improve change of direction.

Strength training, such as weight lifting, is helpful but not a perfect predictor of sports performance, as playing a sport requires more skills than simple strength alone.

=== Neuromuscular adaptations ===
Strength training is not only associated with an increase in muscle mass, but also an improvement in the nervous system's ability to recruit muscle fibers and activate them at a faster rate. Neural adaptations can occur in the motor cortex, the spinal cord, and/or neuromuscular junctions. The initial significant improvements in strength amongst new lifters are a result of increased neural drive, motor unit synchronization, motor unit excitability, rate of force development, muscle fiber conduction velocity, and motor unit discharge rate. Together, these improvements provide an increase in strength separate from muscle hypertrophy. Typically, the main barbell lifts – squat, bench, and deadlift – are performed with a full range of motion, which provides the greatest neuromuscular improvements compared to one-third or two-thirds range of motion. However, there are reasons to perform these lifts with less range of motion, particularly in the powerlifting community. By limiting range of motion, lifters can target a specific joint angle in order to improve their sticking points by training their neural drive. Neuromuscular adaptations are critical for the development of strength, but are especially important in the aging adult population, as the decline in neuromuscular function is roughly three times as great (≈3% per year) as the loss of muscle mass (≈1% per year). By staying active and following a resistance training program, older adults can maintain their movement, stability, balance, and independence.

== History ==
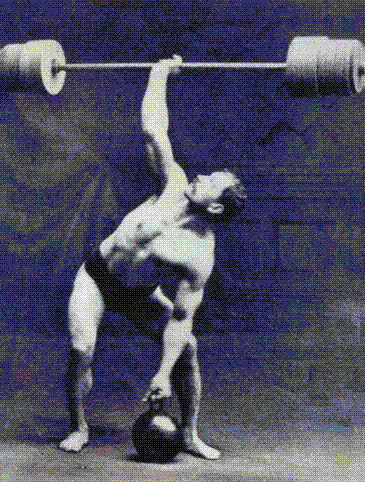
Arthur Saxon performing a Two Hands Anyhow with an early kettlebell and plate-loaded barbell

The genealogy of lifting can be traced back to the beginning of recorded history where humanity's fascination with physical abilities can be found among numerous ancient writings. In many prehistoric tribes, they would have a big rock they would try to lift, and the first one to lift it would inscribe their name into the stone. Such rocks have been found in Greek and Scottish castles. Progressive resistance training dates back at least to Ancient Greece, when legend has it that wrestler Milo of Croton trained by carrying a newborn calf on his back every day until it was fully grown. Another Greek, the physician Galen, described strength training exercises using the halteres (an early form of dumbbell) in the 2nd century.

Ancient Greek sculptures also depict lifting feats. The weights were generally stones, but later gave way to dumbbells. The dumbbell was joined by the barbell in the later half of the 19th century. Early barbells had hollow globes that could be filled with sand or lead shot, but by the end of the century these were replaced by the plate-loading barbell commonly used today.

Weightlifting was first introduced in the Olympics in the 1896 Athens Olympic Games as a part of track and field, and was officially recognized as its own event in 1914.

The 1960s saw the gradual introduction of exercise machines into the still-rare strength training gyms of the time. Weight training became increasingly popular in the 1970s, following the release of the bodybuilding movie Pumping Iron, and the subsequent popularity of Arnold Schwarzenegger. Since the late 1990s, increasing numbers of women have taken up weight training; currently, nearly one in five U.S. women engage in weight training on a regular basis.

== Subpopulations ==
=== Sex differences ===
Men and women have similar reactions to resistance training with comparable effect sizes for hypertrophy and lower body strength, although some studies have found that women experience a greater relative increase in upper-body strength. Because of their greater starting strength and muscle mass, absolute gains are higher in men. In older adults, women experienced a larger increase in lower-body strength.

=== Safety concerns and training related to children ===
Orthopaedic specialists used to recommend that children avoid weight training because the growth plates on their bones might be at risk. The rare reports of growth plate fractures in children who trained with weights occurred under inadequate supervision or improper form or excess weight. There have been no reports of injuries to growth plates in youth training programs that follow established guidelines. The position of the National Strength and Conditioning Association is that strength training is safe for children if properly designed and supervised.

The effects of training on youth have been shown to depend on the methods of training being implemented. Studies from the Journal of Strength and Conditioning Research concluded that both Resistance Training and Plyometric training led to significant improvements in peak torque, peak rate of torque development, and jump performance. Plyometric training also showed a greater improvement in jump performance compared to Resistance training. Another study saw results that suggest that both high-load, low-repetition and moderate-load, high-repetition resistance training can be prescribed to improve muscular fitness in untrained adolescents, as well as the jump height had also increased.

Both plyometrics exercise and resistance training tend to result in better adaptations in the short and long term. This can be attributed to the effect of neuromuscular development, as well as the principle that it comes faster for adolescents than muscular hypertrophy. It is crucial to understand this when creating programs for the youth to avoid injury and/or overtraining. Since adolescents are still growing and are not done with developing not only musculature but also bone and joint structures. Younger children are at greater risk of injury than adults if they drop a weight on themselves or perform an exercise incorrectly. Furthermore, they may lack understanding of, or ignore the safety precautions around weight training equipment. As a result, supervision of minors is considered vital to ensuring the safety of any youth engaging in strength training.

=== Older adults ===
Aging is associated with sarcopenia, a decrease in muscle mass and strength. Resistance training can mitigate this effect, and even the oldest old (those above age 85) can increase their muscle mass with a resistance training program, although to a lesser degree than younger individuals. With more strength older adults have better health, better quality of life, better physical function and fewer falls. Resistance training can improve physical functioning in older people, including the performance of activities of daily living. Resistance training programs are safe for older adults, can be adapted for mobility and disability limitations, and may be used in assisted living settings. Resistance training at lower intensities such as 45% of 1RM can still result in increased muscular strength.

== See also ==
- Endurance training
