= Progressive overload =

Method of strength training

Progressive overload is a principle of strength training and hypertrophy training that allows for continuous gains from training. This principle suggests to gradually increase the stress placed upon the musculoskeletal and nervous system to stimulate muscle growth and strength gain by muscle hypertrophy. This improvement in overall performance will, in turn, allow an athlete to keep increasing the intensity of their training sessions.

== History ==
The first mention of progressive overload in history is associated with Milo of Croton (late 6th century BC), an athlete of Ancient Greece. Per the legend, when Milo was an adolescent a neighbor of his had a newborn calf. Milo saw the small calf, lifted it onto his shoulders, and walked around for a while. The next day Milo returned and did the same thing. He continued this routine day after day. As the calf grew, so did Milo’s strength. His lifting each day prepared him to lift a little bit more the next day. At the end of four years, Milo was lifting a full-grown bull onto his shoulders.

The method was developed by Thomas Delorme, M.D. while he rehabilitated soldiers after World War II. At the time, most medical doctors believed that weightlifting should be avoided because any type of extreme effort was not desirable for the heart. However, Dr. Thomas Delorme had been active in weightlifting for years and believed that it could have beneficial effects to rehabilitation. In 1944, Delorme was working at the Gardiner General Hospital in Chicago when he met Thaddeus Kawalek, an army veteran that was struggling with a knee injury. Kawalek was also a weightlifter and believed in Delorme's theory about the benefits of the sport. From there, Kawalek became Delorme's first patient in his alternative treatment. Kawalek recovered much faster than patients in similar conditions and regained full use of his knee. Today, the technique is recognized as a fundamental principle for success in various forms of strength training programs including fitness training, weight lifting, high intensity training and physical therapy programs.

== Scientific principles ==
The goal of strength-training programs is to increase one’s physical strength and performance. This is achieved through resistance training. By placing the exercise musculature under greater-than-normal demand, the body will start a natural adaptation process, improving its capabilities to endure that higher amount of stress. Neuromuscular adaptation will occur first, which will already increase the individual’s strength when lifting. With consistency in the training sessions, what will follow will be an increase in overall muscle mass, the strengthening of connective tissue, structural changes and physical increases in the cross-section of the muscle.

Progressive overload in principle is used to allow for the continuous adaptations under stress, by increasing the stress as the body adapts. The process of adaptation slows down or does not occur unless there is a greater magnitude of stress for the body to overcome.

== Methodology ==
In order to minimize injury and maximize results, a novice should begin at a comfortable level of muscular intensity and advance towards overload of the muscles over the course of an exercise program. Progressive overload requires a gradual increase in volume, intensity, frequency or time in order to achieve the targeted goal of the user. In this context, volume, intensity, and frequency are defined as follows:

- Volume - the total number of repetitions multiplied by the resistance used to perform each repetition.
- Intensity - the percent value of maximal functional capacity, or expressed as a percent of the maximum number of repetitions.
- Frequency - how often a person engages in training activities.
- Interval duration - the time in between sets of same exercise or between different exercises.

This technique results in greater gains in physical strength and muscular growth, but there are limits. An excess of training stimuli can lead to the problem of overtraining. Overtraining is the decline in training performance over the course of a training program, often accompanied by an increased risk of illness or injury or a decreased desire to exercise. To help avoid this problem, the technique of periodization is applied. Periodization can apply different load progression strategies depending on individual fitness goals. Periodization in the context of fitness or strength training programs means scheduling for adequate recovery time between training sessions, and for variety over the course of a long-term program. Motivation can be maintained by avoiding the monotony of repeating identical exercise routines.

=== Case study ===
Through experimentation, an athlete can learn what the maximum number of repetitions they can perform is at a specific weight. An individual who finds they can do 8 repetitions of the bench press exercise with 50 kg can use this as their baseline. From that point on, the athlete should focus on improving one of the categories mentioned in the methodology section: volume, intensity, frequency, or interval duration. In this example, the athlete could do the same number of repetitions but with 52 kg. Eventually, through the body's natural adaptation process, an increase in strength and muscle mass will allow the subject to continue increasing the weight.
