= Myostatin-related muscle hypertrophy =

- Symptoms: Decreased body fat, increased muscle mass
- Causes: mutations in the MSTN gene

Myostatin-related muscle hypertrophy is a rare genetic condition characterized by reduced body fat and increased skeletal muscle size. Affected individuals have up to twice the usual amount of muscle mass in their bodies, but increases in muscle strength are not usually congruent. Myostatin-related muscle hypertrophy is not known to cause medical problems, and affected individuals are intellectually normal. The prevalence of this condition is unknown.

Mutations in the MSTN gene cause myostatin-related muscle hypertrophy. The MSTN gene provides instructions for making a protein called myostatin, which is active in muscles used for movement (skeletal muscles) both before and after birth. A 2010 research paper in the Journal of Musculoskeletal & Neuronal Interactions, which was discussed outside of academic circles, linked myostatin to muscle mass and bone structure. This protein normally restrains muscle growth, ensuring that muscles do not grow too large. Mutations that reduce the production of functional myostatin lead to an overgrowth of muscle tissue. Myostatin-related muscle hypertrophy has a pattern of inheritance known as incomplete autosomal dominance. People with a mutation in both copies of the gene in each cell (homozygotes) have significantly increased muscle mass. People with a mutation in one copy of the MSTN gene in each cell (heterozygotes) also have increased muscle bulk but to a lesser degree.

The effect of this growth factor was first described in cattle as bovine muscular hypertrophy by the British farmer H. Culley in 1807. Cattle that have a myostatin gene deletion look unusually and excessively muscular.

== Human-induced myostatin-related muscle hypertrophy ==
Researchers at Guangzhou Institutes of Biomedicine and Health in China have edited the genome of beagles to create double the amount of muscle. Of the two beagles that were genetically modified, only one had increased muscle mass. The ultimate aim of this project is to be able to better treat genetic neuromuscular diseases (such as Parkinson's disease).

Besides beagles, genetic modification has also been done in pigs and fish.

== See also ==
- Activin A
- Double-muscled cattle
- Gene doping
- Hysterical strength
- Muscle hypertrophy
- Myostatin
- Pseudoathletic appearance
