= Shoulder pads =

Shoulder pads may refer to:

- Shoulder pad (fashion)
- Shoulder pad (sport), particularly gridiron football
- Shoulder pad sign, medical condition
