= Metabolic window =

Concept in strength training

The metabolic window (also called the anabolic window or protein window) is a term used in strength training to describe the 2 hour (may depend on the individual) period after exercise during which nutrition can supposedly shift the body from a catabolic state to an anabolic one. Specifically, it is during this period that the intake of protein and carbohydrates can aid in the increase of muscle mass.

Increasing protein synthesis, reducing muscle protein breakdown and replenishing muscle glycogen are all processes that take place at a slow rate in the body. When fueling the body with nutrients immediately after a workout, the body increases the rate of repair and is at its prime functioning to gain muscle mass.

While there is not currently sufficient scientific evidence to support the metabolic window theory, understanding anabolism vs. catabolism, the concept of fasted exercise, and the role glycogen and protein play, can help find methods to work out and build muscle in the most advantageous way.

== Anabolism vs. catabolism ==
The metabolic window is based on the body's anabolic response. Anabolism is a set of metabolic processes that build complex molecules from simpler ones. Catabolism on the other hand is the opposite reaction, and breaks down molecules, which in turn releases energy. However it is important to understand how exactly the body operates and is able to perform these metabolic processes at its optimum potential. Although there are certain uncontrollable factors that affect the human body's metabolism, there are things that are in one's own control;

1. Eat high quality proteins, fats and carbohydrates.
2. Avoid processed foods.
3. Reduce alcohol intake and steer clear of smoking or other substances.
4. Aim for at least seven hours of quality sleep each night.
5. Manage stress through healthy coping mechanisms.
6. Stay well-hydrated by drinking plenty of water.
7. Engage in regular physical activity.

Catabolism is able to occur no matter the food, whether it's high or low in nutrition. After strength training, the body is anabolic, yet anabolism only performs well when the body is receiving necessary nutrients like vegetables, fruits, and protein-rich foods, especially lean meats. The effects of providing a foundation of high quality building blocks in the body allow it to heal, repair, and grow.

== Fasted exercise ==
The evidence for replenishing depleted energy levels only applies when they are completely diminished at the beginning of training, such as during fasted exercise. During fasted exercise, an individual goes through long periods of the day without eating, which causes the body's energy levels to go through cycles of spiking and exhaustion. When this period is followed with a training session, it propels the body into an uncomfortable state. When the body has abnormally low levels of various nutrients (such as carbohydrates and proteins), and are then replenished, it forces an even higher adaptation in the body. During fasted exercise, an increase in muscle protein breakdown causes the pre-exercise negative amino acid level to continue in the post exercise period despite increases in muscle protein synthesis. This is why it would make sense to provide immediate nutritional replenishment after exercise as there were already such low levels before training started. This would turn the catabolic state of the body into an anabolic one and therefore, promote the metabolic window as desired. More or less, the body is so used to receiving food that during a fast it does not know what to do, causing it to enter a state of panic. When one pushes through this depleted state, and then finally nourishes the body again, it absorbs even more of the nutrients and pulls out only the essential elements. An example of this diet would be Intermittent Fasting.

== Glycogen ==
Glycogen plays a critical role during exercise and post-exercise recovery, and is a key component of muscle hypertrophy. As the primary fuel source for muscle contraction, glycogen accounts for up to 80% of ATP (adenosine triphosphate) production during physical activity, with ATP serving as the body's main energy currency. ATP is a necessity to the body, especially during exercise when a constant supply of energy is required. Glucose, the precursor of ATP, is stored throughout the body primarily in the form of glycogen, particularly in the liver and skeletal muscles. As we exercise, glycogen is broken down into glucose and provides the needed, immediate energy for cells.

Given glycogen's significant role during training, prompt post-exercise replenishment is often recommended. This can be achieved through the consumption of carbohydrate-rich foods such as fruits, honey, and whole grains, or even a post training drink, like a recovery shake. While the body's metabolism typically restores glycogen levels through a regular dietary intake of 3 to 4 balanced meals per day, some theorists suggest that timing may be critical.

The concept of the "metabolic window" indicates that the body's ability to replenish glycogen and synthesize muscle protein is most efficient within a narrow time frame after exercising. These theorists claim that even delaying the intake of nutrients by as little as two hours after training may significantly reduce both protein synthesis and muscle glycogen restoration.

== Muscle protein breakdown and muscle protein synthesis ==
There are also other factors that come into play when discussing the metabolic window theory, which include muscle protein breakdown (MPB) and muscle protein synthesis (MPS). Muscle protein synthesis (MPS) is the metabolic process of building muscle mass. Muscle protein breakdown (MPB) is the opposite process of breaking down muscular tissue. Muscle protein breakdown and muscle protein synthesis occur concurrently, meaning there is a constant renewal of protein in the body. The net muscle protein balance (NBAL) is the relationship between muscle protein breakdown and muscle protein synthesis and is determined by the stability between the two processes. The anabolic state theory suggests that it is critical to consume proteins and carbohydrates immediately after resistance training to increase muscle protein synthesis, reduce muscle protein breakdown, and replenish glycogen levels in the muscle. In response to resistance training, muscle protein breakdown increases but does not increase as much as protein synthesis. Since eating protein and carbohydrates immediately after exercising is known to reduce MPB, it is also assumed that this will increase lean muscle mass by increasing the net protein balance. Muscle protein breakdown targets many types of proteins including damaged proteins and proteins that are rapidly turning over. To increase mass muscle size, changes depend on myofibrillar proteins and MPB would need to target these proteins specifically. Since MPB affects multiple types of protein, limiting protein breakdown through post-workout nutrition will hinder proper recovery by degrading the essential proteins for rebuilding muscle. According to a study performed in 2010, it found that it is not necessary to include large amounts of carbohydrates in post-workout nutrition since there are nutrient solutions that contain enough Essential amino acids and an adequate amount of carbohydrates to produce the maximum anabolic protein response.

== Protein intake before and after workout ==
In 2017, a study attempted to test the anabolic theory and the effects of consuming equal amounts of protein before and after resistance training on muscle strength, hypertrophy, and body composition changes. The subjects of the study included 21 males that had more than one year of experience in resistance training. These subjects were all recruited from a university setting and were all given an equal dose of protein consumed immediately either before working out or post-training. All participants were natural athletes; they had no history of anabolic steroid usage. The subjects of the study were all paired based on their strength in the squat and bench press exercises. The pairs were then put into two different control groups. One group consumed 25 grams of protein and 1 gram of carbohydrates before the workout and the other control group was given the same amount of protein and carbohydrates post-workout. The study consisted of a full-body routine that ran on three-week sessions on nonconsecutive days for ten weeks. The results of this study showed that the protein consumption before the workout and after the workout had shown similar effects on all the subjects studied.

== See also ==
- Anaerobic exercise
- Bodybuilding
- Nutrient timing
- Powerlifting
- Resistance training
- Weightlifting
