= Superhuman strength =

Ability

Superhuman strength is a superpower commonly invoked in fiction and other literary works, such as mythology. It is the power to exert force and lift weights beyond what is physically possible for an ordinary human being.

== History ==
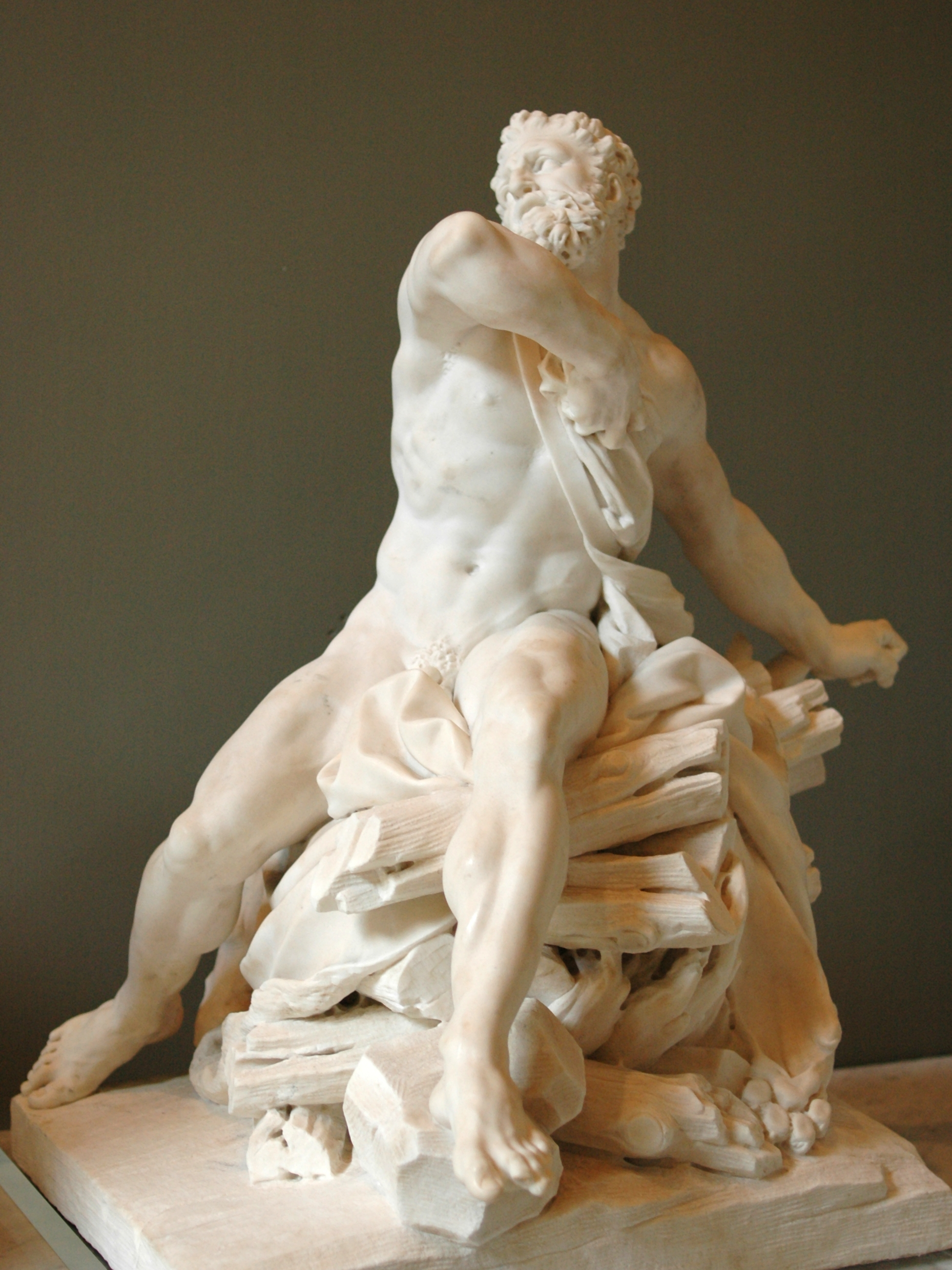
Depiction of Hercules by sculptor Guillaume Coustou the Elder, 1704.

Many fictional works involving superhuman strength are rooted in ancient chronicles.

Attempts to modify the human body in order to gain extraordinary strength have also been depicted in fiction through characters such as Terminator, Robocop, Iron Man, and Cyborg. Similarly, humans too have tried to use external devices to enhance their strength. A device for this purpose was patented by Nicholas Yagn in 1890; the device was described to be an apparatus for facilitating walking, running, and jumping through the use of bags of compressed air. The United States Department of Defense is considering a variety of technologies to create an exoskeleton intended for military use to enhance soldier performance.

== Applications ==
Records describe instances of people going beyond 'normal' strength in specific circumstances, as in the case of Tom Boyle, who was able to lift the front of a car in order to rescue a person trapped beneath it. Penn State professor of kinesiology Vladimir Zatsiorsky stated that extraordinary strength can occur when a person engages their muscles through the conscious "exertion of will". Zatsiorsky claims that trained athletes can improve their strength under specific conditions of competition. Fear can also cause a person to exhibit enhanced human strength, for example hysterical strength.

== See also ==
- Berserker
- Epic poetry
- Furor Teutonicus
- Myostatin
- Physical strength
- Hysterical strength
