= One-repetition maximum =

Maximum weight that can be lifted at once

One-repetition maximum (one-rep max or 1RM) in weight training is the maximum amount of weight that a person can possibly lift for one repetition. It may also be considered as the maximum amount of force that can be generated in one maximal contraction.

== Usage ==
One repetition maximum can be used for determining an individual's maximum strength and is the method for determining the winner in events such as powerlifting and weightlifting competitions.

One repetition maximum can also be used as an upper limit, in order to determine the desired "load" for an exercise (as a percentage of the 1RM). Weight training protocols often use 1RM when programming to ensure the exerciser reaches resistance overload, especially when the exercise objective is muscular strength, endurance or hypertrophy. By understanding the maximal potential of the muscle, it is possible to reach resistance overload by increasing the number of repetitions for an exercise.

== Measuring 1RM ==
Most commonly, 1RM is determined directly using trial and error testing. The participant lifts progressively heavier free weights, resting for several minutes between each attempt, until the maximum weight for which the participant can complete one full repetition is determined. The 1RM then lies between this weight and the next highest attempted weight. This type of assessment is considered the most accurate way to determine 1RM, and is considered safe when performed correctly. However, as adequate rest must be given between attempts, proper 1RM assessment may be very time-consuming if the initial weight is far from the 1RM.

Novices may find the procedure intimidating and unnerving, and be reluctant to add weight. There is also a risk of injury if a participant is unfamiliar with the proper form. A spotter can alleviate these concerns.

== Estimating 1RM ==
This chart compares the different formulas. The formulas greatly diverge after about 10 reps.

The 1RM can also be estimated indirectly using repetition testing on submaximal loads, as popularized by the use of 1RM calculators. Although in many cases the estimate is reasonable, in other cases the estimate may vary by 10% or more from the actual 1RM. Using a specialized formula for the specific exercise improves accuracy. The use of anthropometric variables such as gender, age, height, weight, body fat percentage, and girth does not improve accuracy. Also, most formulas are for experienced weightlifters, and novices may find their actual one rep maximum is much lower because their nervous system cannot handle the stress of a high weight.

There are many formulas used to estimate 1RM using the submaximal method. In the formulas below, $r$ is the number of repetitions performed and $w$ is the amount of weight used (note that $w$ is a factor of each formula, so the unit of measurement doesn't matter).

Formulas for estimating 1RM
Name	1RM Formula
Adams	$w \cdot \frac{1}{1-0.02r}$
Baechle	$w \cdot (1+ 0.033 r )$
Berger	$w \cdot \frac{1}{1.0261 e^{-0.0262r} }$
Brown	$w \cdot ( 0.9849 + 0.0328r )$
Brzycki	$w \cdot \frac {36}{37 - r} = \frac w { \frac{37}{36} - \frac 1 {36} r} \approx \frac w {1.0278 - 0.0278r}$
Epley	$w \cdot \left ( 1+ r/{30}\right )$, assuming $r > 1.$
Kemmler et al.	$w \cdot ( 0.988 + 0.0104r + 0.00190r^2-0.0000584r^3 )$
Kellner	$w \cdot (0.98e^{0.0338r})$
Landers	$w \cdot \frac{1}{1.013 - 0.0267123r}$
Lombardi	$w \cdot r^{0.10}$
Mayhew et al.	$w \cdot \frac{1}{0.522 + 0.419e^{-0.055r}}$
Naclerio et al.	$w \cdot \frac{1}{0.951 e^{-0.021r}}$
O'Conner et al.	$w \cdot \left(1 + 0.025 r \right)$
Wathen	$w \cdot \frac{1}{0.4880 + 0.538e^{-0.075r}}$

Of the formulas, the Epley and the Brzycki formulas are most commonly used. Epley and Brzycki return identical results for 10 repetitions. However, for fewer than 10 reps, Epley returns a slightly higher estimated maximum. For example, if a person can lift 100 pounds on a given exercise for 10 reps, the estimated one rep max would be 133 pounds for both formulae. However, if the person were to complete only 6 reps, then Epley would estimate a one rep maximum of approximately 120 pounds, while Brzycki would return an estimate of approximately 116 pounds.

Several more complex formulae have been proposed which use different coefficients for different rep numbers and sometimes even for different exercises.

Compared to a formal 1RM test, the submaximal estimation method is safer and quicker. The estimate may not be accurate, but can be used as the starting point for a 1RM test. The formulas can also be used the other way, to calculate what weight is needed for a given repetition maximum, as a percent of the estimated or actual 1RM.

== See also ==
- Weight training
