= Brody myopathy =

Genetic disorder; difficulty relaxing muscles after exercise

- Other names: Brody disease (BD)
- This condition is inherited in an autosomal recessive manner
- Specialty: Neurology

Brody myopathy, also called Brody disease, is a rare disorder that affects skeletal muscle function. BD was first characterized in 1969 by Dr. Irwin A. Brody at Duke University Medical Center. Individuals with BD have difficulty relaxing their muscles after exercise. This difficulty in relaxation leads to symptoms including cramps, stiffness, and discomfort in the muscles of the limbs and face. Symptoms are heightened by exercise and commonly progress in severity throughout adulthood.

== Signs and symptoms ==
Symptoms include stiffness and sometimes muscle cramping after exercise (pseudo-myotonia) and especially when exposed to cold. The most commonly affected muscles are in the arms, legs, and eyelids. Individuals with Brody myopathy also sometimes experience weakness, myalgia, and rhabdomyolysis. Some have a pseudoathletic appearance with hypertrophic muscles.

== Cause ==
Most cases of BD are inherited through autosomal recessive mutations in ATP2A1, where each copy of the affected individual's gene contain a mutation. The gene involved in BD encodes the fast-twitch skeletal muscle ATPase, SERCA1. SERCA1 is a protein pump that uses ATP to pump Ca^{2+} ions from the cytosol to the sarcoplasmic reticulum in skeletal muscle. In those with BD, SERCA1 pumps are unable to effectively move Ca^{2+} across the membrane, leading to increased levels of cytoplasmic Ca^{2+}. Increases in cytoplasmic Ca^{2+} levels interfere with muscle contraction, leading to the characteristic symptoms of BD.

In some cases of BD, no mutations in ATP2A1 have been observed. Disease transmission in cases of non-ATP2A1 BD have been characterized as autosomal dominant pattern of inheritance. These cases have revealed that the cause of the disease likely exhibits genetic heterogeneity, meaning the disease involves mutations in other locations within the genome (although no other loci have been identified in the development of BD as of now).

== Diagnosis ==
Diagnosis of BD begins with clinical evaluation of individuals for characteristic symptoms of cramping and stiffness of exercised muscles.

Blood testing may be used to measure serum creatine kinase, which ranges from normal to slightly elevated in those with BD. Skeletal muscle biopsies are used to examine muscle fibers. Biopsies in individuals with BD often show variation in muscle fiber size, atrophied fast-twitch muscle fibers, and increased nuclei number. Electromyography (EMG) can be used in diagnosis to rule out myotonia, or muscle stiffness that is detected by EMG. Individuals with BD have stiff muscles but normal EMG results (pseudo-myotonia), where no myotonic discharges are detected. Genetic testing may also be used in the diagnosis of BD to look for mutations in ATP2A1.

== Treatment ==
There is no cure for BD, although treatment options are available for reducing the negative symptoms of BD. The drugs dantrolene and verapamil are used in BD treatment due to their effects on Ca^{2+}. Dantrolene is a muscle relaxer that decreases the symptoms of BD by inhibiting Ca^{2+} release channels in the sarcoplasmic reticulum, while verapamil sequesters Ca^{2+} in the sarcoplasmic reticulum of muscle cells by functioning as a Ca^{2+} channel blocker.

These drugs act by limiting the amount of Ca^{2+} from being released from the sarcoplasmic reticulum. When a muscle is stimulated, Ca^{2+} is released from the sarcoplasmic reticulum into the cytoplasm where it binds to a protein called troponin. This event allows the muscle fibers to overlap, causing a contraction. In BD, Ca^{2+} levels are high in the cytoplasm, which means Ca^{2+} can readily bind troponin, leading to muscles that are in an extended state of contraction.
