= Nutrient timing =

Sports dieting concept

Nutrient timing is a sports dieting concept which suggests that time may be a missing dimension in improved muscular development. This concept represents a change over the previous school of thought that focused on protein loading without emphasizing the synchronicity between eating and exercising.

Proper nutrient timing takes into account two dimensions that directly correlate to performance:

1. The consumption of the substrates in ideal proportions.
2. The timing between exogenous fueling and exercise. When the right substrates are present at the ideal times, the result might be improved performance and growth.

Nutrient timing may enhance performance of exercise, competition, and daily life expectations. The amount of each nutrient plays a role in performance and recovery. Recovery is essential to keep going in daily routines, competitions, and fitness in general. Fueling recovery and fitness may be enhanced by using the timing of nutrients around a performance aspect of life. This timing is not essential to good performance, but it is a small detail that may help if one is looking to gain strength.

Many athletes will consume certain macros pre, post and during workouts looking to maximize the effects of the “anabolic window,” which is the suggested 15–45-minute time frame after physical activity. Carbohydrates digested during and after a workout will help replace muscle glycogen, which is the primary fuel used by the body during exercise and lead to enhanced recovery time. Protein intake combined with carbohydrate intake pre workout will help increase the process of protein and glycogen synthesis post workout. Glycogen which is the main substrate during high intensity exercise will decrease with even short bouts of activity

This method can be used not only during the anabolic window but the remainder of the day after physical activity as well where proper nutrition plays key roles in increasing protein and glycogen synthesis, insulin production and sensitivity, decreasing muscle inflammation, muscular development and faster recovery time. Those athletes looking for an extra edge can use this method to enhance their ability to recover faster and push harder and take their training to the next level.
