= Physical strength =

Measure of a human's exertion of force on physical objects

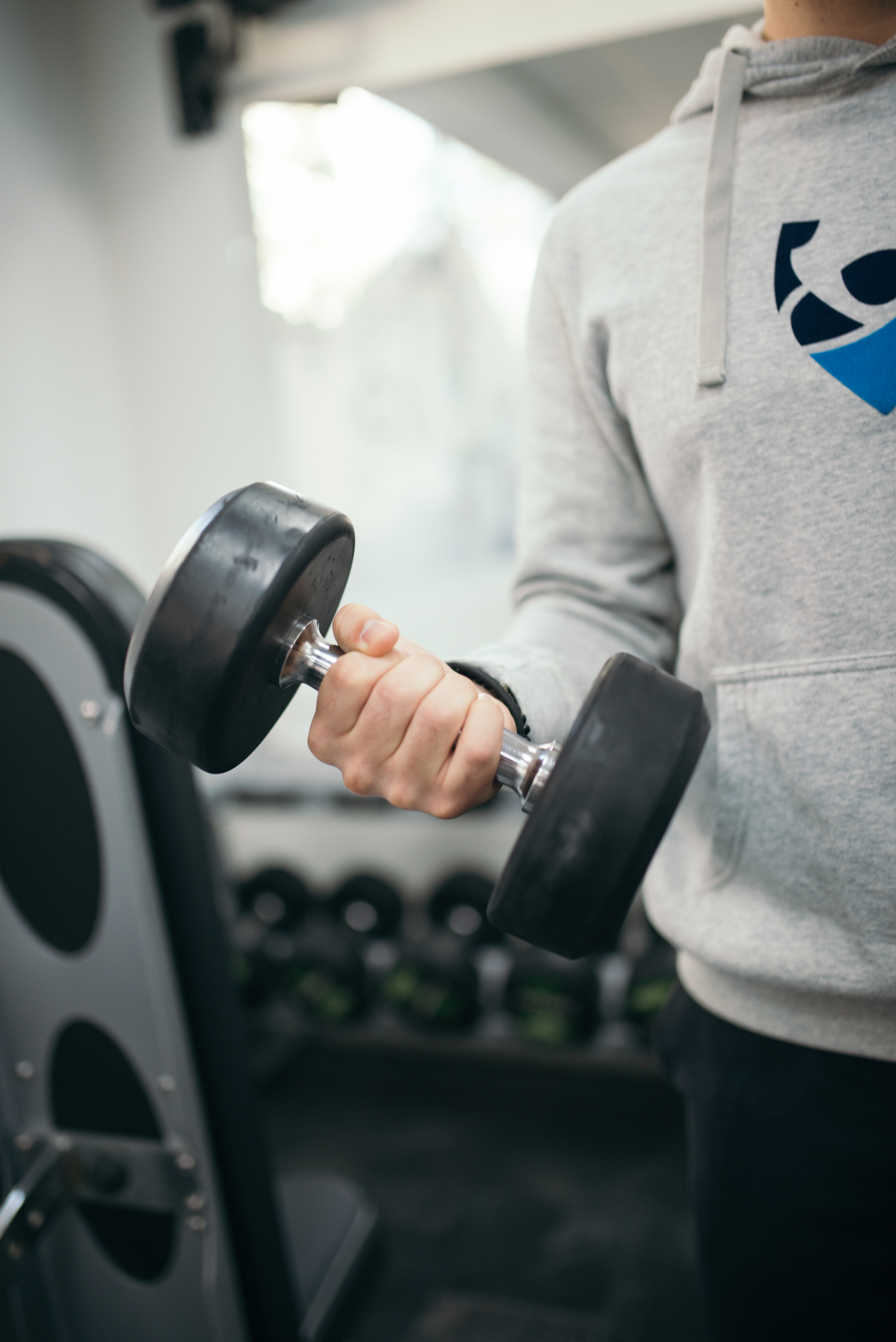
A common method of physical strength training

Physical strength is the measure of an individual's exertion of force on physical objects. Increasing physical strength is the goal of strength training.

== Overview ==
An individual's physical strength is determined by two factors: the cross-sectional area of muscle fibers recruited to generate force and the intensity of the recruitment. Individuals with a high proportion of type I slow twitch muscle fibers will be relatively weaker than a similar individual with a high proportion of type II fast twitch fibers, but would have greater endurance. The genetic inheritance of muscle fiber type sets the outermost boundaries of physical strength possible (barring the use of enhancing agents such as testosterone), although the unique position within this envelope is determined by training.

Individual muscle fiber ratios can be determined through a muscle biopsy. Other considerations are the ability to recruit muscle fibers for a particular activity, joint angles, and the length of each limb. For a given cross-section, shorter limbs are able to lift more weight. The ability to gain muscle also varies person to person, based mainly upon genes dictating the amounts of hormones secreted, but also on sex, age, health of the person, and adequate nutrients in the diet. A one-repetition maximum test is the most accurate way to determine maximum muscular strength.

== Strength capability ==
There are various ways to measure physical strength of a person or population. Strength capability analysis is usually done in the field of ergonomics where a particular task (e.g., lifting a load, pushing a cart, etc.) and/or a posture is evaluated and compared to the capabilities of the section of the population that the task is intended towards. The external reactive moments and forces on the joints are usually used in such cases. The strength capability of the joint is denoted by the amount of moment that the muscle force can create at the joint to counter the external moment.

Skeletal muscles produce reactive forces and moments at the joints. To avoid injury or fatigue, when person is performing a task, such as pushing or lifting a load, the external moments created at the joints due to the load at the hand and the weight of the body segments must be ideally less than the muscular moment strengths at the joint.

One of the first sagittal-plane models to predict strength was developed by Chaffin in 1969. Based on this model, the external moments at each joint must not exceed the muscle strength moments at that joint:

M_{j/L} < S_{j}

Where S_{j} is the muscle strength moment at the joint, j, and M_{j/L} is the external moment at the joint, j, due to load, L, and the body segments preceding the joint in the top-down analysis.

Top-down analysis is the method of calculating the reactive moments and forces at each joint starting at the hand, all the way till the ankle and foot. In a 6-segment model, the joints considered are elbow, shoulder, L5/S1 disc of the spine, hip, knee and ankle. It is common to ignore the wrist joint in manual calculations. Software intended for such calculation use the wrist joint also, dividing the lower arm into hand and forearm segments.

== Prediction of static strength ==
Static strength prediction is the method of predicting the strength capabilities of a person or a population (based on anthropometry) for a particular task and/or posture (an isometric contraction). To predict capability, manual calculations are usually performed using the top-down analysis on a six or seven-link model, based on available information about the case and then compared to standard guidelines, such as the one provided by the National Institute for Occupational Safety and Health.

== See also ==
- Superhuman strength
- Hysterical strength
