= Shoulder pad sign =

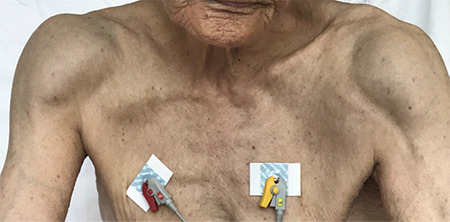
- Shoulder pad sign
- Differential diagnosis: AL amyloidosis

The shoulder pad sign is an enlargement of the anterior shoulder due to amyloid deposition in periarticular soft tissue. This type of infiltration is not common, but it is pathognomonic for AL amyloidosis.

Analysis of the amyloid protein has demonstrated that it has a kappa III Ig light chain structure. The variable region of kappa III amyloid proteins may show an increased likelihood of depositing in soft tissue.
