= Pseudohypertrophy =

False enlargement of muscle due to infiltration of fat or other tissue

- Other names: false enlargement
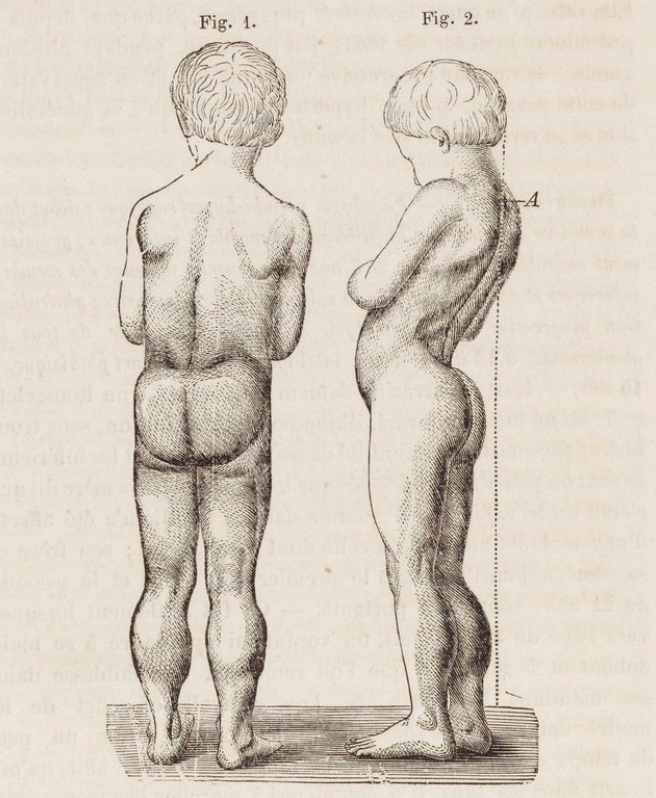
- Drawing of seven-year-old boy with Duchenne muscular dystrophy. There is pseudohypertrophy of the lower limbs.
- Symptoms: Weakness
- Causes: muscle disease, nerve disease

Pseudohypertrophy, or false enlargement, is an increase in the size of an organ due to infiltration of a tissue not normally found in that organ. It is commonly applied to enlargement of a muscle due to infiltration of fat or connective tissue, famously in Duchenne muscular dystrophy. This is in contrast with typical muscle hypertrophy, in which the muscle tissue itself increases in size. Because pseudohypertrophy is not a result of increased muscle tissue, the muscles look bigger but are actually atrophied and thus weaker. Pseudohypertrophy is typically the result of a disease, which can be a disease of muscle or a disease of the nerve supplying the muscle.

Causes of pseudohypertrophy include muscle diseases: dystrophinopathies, limb-girdle muscular dystrophies, metabolic myopathy, Dystrophic myotonias, Non-dystrophic myotonias, endocrine disorders, parasitic muscle conditions, amyloid and sarcoid myopathy, and granulomatous myositis.

Neurological causes include radiculopathy, poliomyelitis, Charcot-Marie-Tooth disease, spinal muscular atrophy.

In pseudohypertrophy where the atrophied muscle tissue has been infiltrated by fat tissue, upon palpitation the seemingly large muscles feel doughy.

Not all muscles infiltrated by fat or other tissue are pseudohypertrophic. In muscular steatosis, sometimes the muscles may appear a normal or a slender size, even though the atrophied muscle has been infiltrated with fat tissue, such as the calf muscles in Bethlem myopathy 1. In myosclerosis, the muscle is infiltrated with connective tissue and fibrosis, having a firm, "woody" feel upon palpitation, with the muscles appearing slender.

== Etymology ==
Pseudohypertrophy can be broken up into the following roots, suffixes, and prefixes:

- Pseudo means 'false' or 'fake'. The etymology is from the Greek word ψεύδω (pseúdō), which means to lie or deceive.
- hyper means 'extreme' or 'beyond normal'. The etymology is from the Greek word ὑπέρ (hupér), which means over, above; beyond, to the extreme.
- trophy means 'nourishment', or 'development'. The etymology is from the Greek word τροφή (trophḗ), which means food, nourishment.

The term was used by Duchenne de Boulogne in his description of Duchenne muscular dystrophy in one of his works "paralysie musculaire pseudo-hypertrophique."

== Other names ==
As well as being known as 'false enlargement,' when the muscle has been infiltrated by fat tissue, historically it has also been called muscular steatosis, pseudohypertrophic atrophy, lipomatous pseudohypertrophy, interstitial lipomatosis, lipomatous muscular dystrophy, or atrophia lipomatosa. It is also known as fatty atrophy of muscle (not to be confused with fat atrophy, which is atrophy of adipose tissue), as muscle tissue is replaced by fat tissue, the actual muscle atrophies while the fat tissue replaces the bulk.
