= Muscle hypertrophy =

Enlargement or overgrowth of a muscle organ

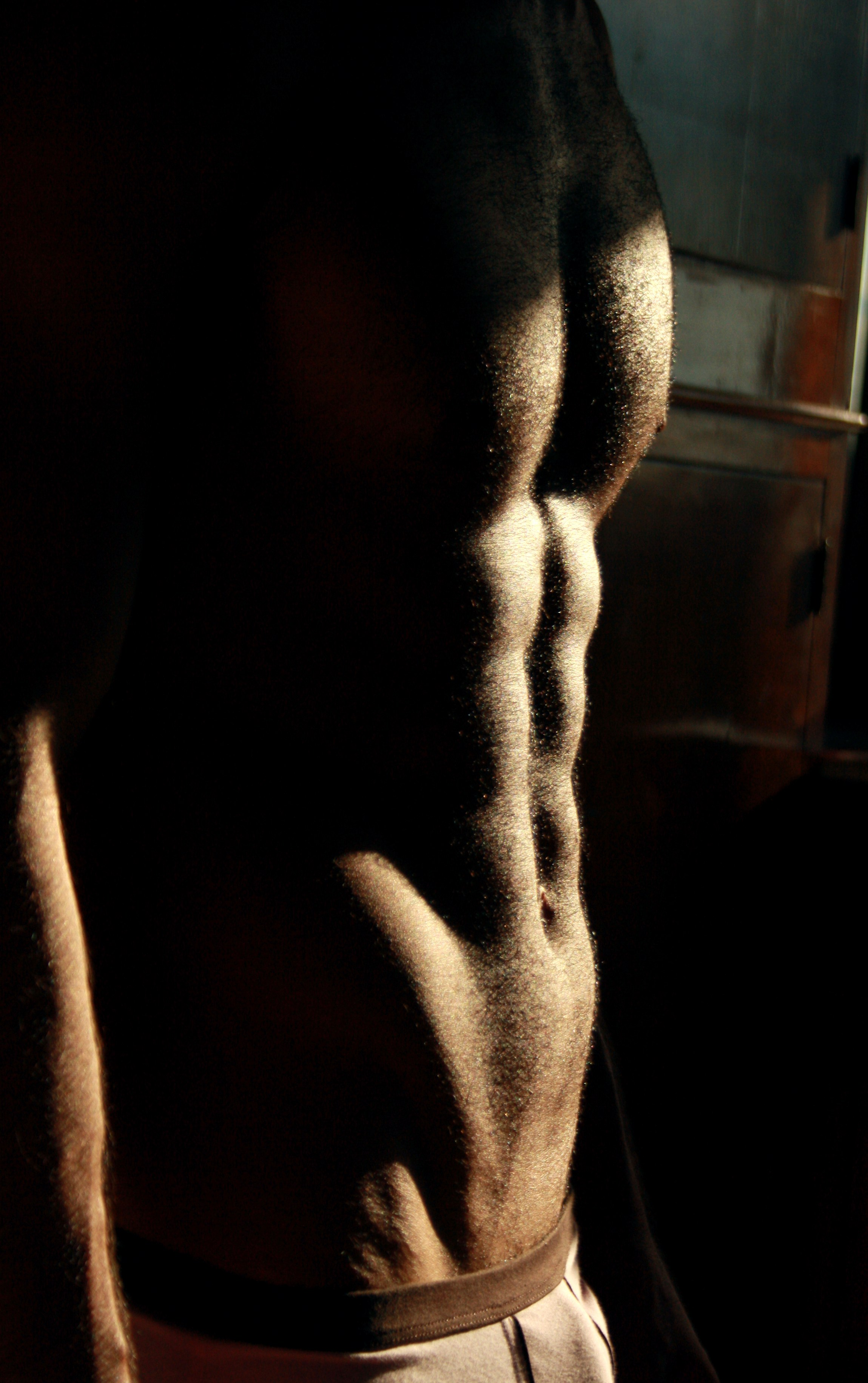
Athletes use a combination of strength training, diet, and nutritional supplementation to induce muscle hypertrophy.

Muscle hypertrophy, also known as muscle building involves a hypertrophy or increase in size of skeletal muscle through a growth in size of its component cells. Two factors contribute to hypertrophy: sarcoplasmic hypertrophy, which focuses more on increased muscle glycogen storage; and myofibrillar hypertrophy, which focuses more on increased myofibril size. It is the primary focus of bodybuilding-related activities.

== Hypertrophy stimulation ==
A range of stimuli can increase the volume of muscle cells. These changes occur as an adaptive response that serves to increase the ability to generate force or resist fatigue in anaerobic conditions.

=== Strength training ===
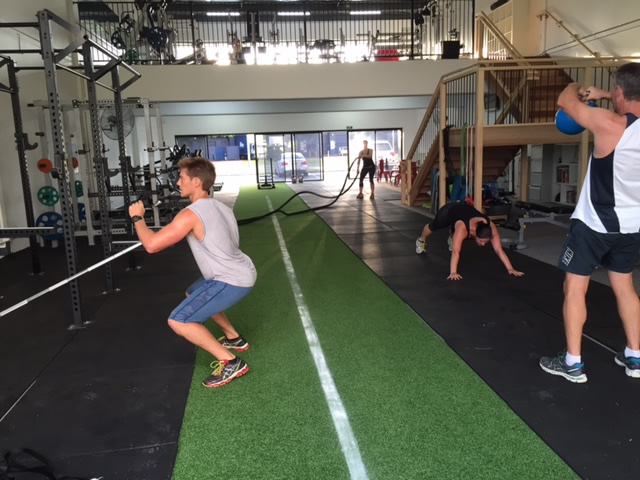
Strength training is used to regulate muscle hypertrophy.

Strength training (resistance training) causes neural and muscular adaptations which increase the capacity of an athlete to exert force through voluntary muscular contraction: After an initial period of neuro-muscular adaptation, the muscle tissue expands by creating sarcomeres (contractile elements) and increasing non-contractile elements like sarcoplasmic fluid. The majority of strength progression is largely due to neural adaptations such as motor unit recruitment, synchronization, and firing efficiency. These allow for measurable muscle hypertrophy.

Muscular hypertrophy can be induced by progressive overload, a strategy of progressively increasing resistance or repetitions over successive bouts of exercise to maintain a high level of effort. However, the precise mechanisms are not clearly understood; the current accepted theory is mechanical tension. Mechanical tension is known to activate pathways such as mTOR, which is responsible for protein synthesis, a mechanism that directly contributes to muscle hypertrophy. Mechanical tension activates mechanosensitive pathways, including mTOR signaling, which increases muscle protein synthesis and contributes directly to hypertrophy.

Often, people may do a superset, which is when someone performs two different exercises immediately after each other with little to no rest time. This allows for increased training efficiency and volume.

Muscular hypertrophy plays an important role in competitive bodybuilding and strength sports like powerlifting, American football, and Olympic weightlifting.

=== Blood flow restriction training ===
Blood flow restriction (BFR) training involves the use of cuffs or bands to partially restrict blood flow to the working muscles during low-load resistance exercise. This method has been shown to induce hypertrophy comparable to traditional high-load training, likely due to mechanical tension and muscle fiber recruitment. BFR training is particularly useful for individuals who cannot tolerate high mechanical loads, such as those recovering from injury or older adults.

=== Anaerobic training ===
The best approach to specifically achieve muscle growth (as opposed to focusing on gaining strength, power, or endurance) remains controversial; it was generally considered that consistent anaerobic strength training will produce hypertrophy over the long term, in addition to its effects on muscular strength and endurance. Muscular hypertrophy can be increased through strength training and other short-duration, high-intensity anaerobic exercises. Lower-intensity, longer-duration aerobic exercise generally does not result in very effective tissue hypertrophy; instead, endurance athletes enhance storage of fats and carbohydrates within the muscles, as well as neovascularization.

== Temporary swelling ==
During a workout, increased blood flow to metabolically active areas causes muscles to temporarily increase in size. This phenomenon is referred to as transient hypertrophy. Longer-term hypertrophy occurs due to more permanent changes in muscle structure.

Causes of muscle swelling may include:

"Muscle swelling occurs as a result of the following:

(a) resistance exercise can increase phosphocreatine and hydrogen ion accumulations due to blood lactate and growth hormone production, and

(b) the high lactate and hydrogen ion concentrations may accelerate water uptake in muscle cells according to cell permeability because the molecular weights of the lactate and hydrogen ions are smaller than that of muscle glycogen."

== Non-training factors affecting hypertrophy ==
=== Genetics ===
Biological factors, such as DNA, gender, nutrition, and training variables, can affect muscle hypertrophy. Individual differences in genetics account for a substantial portion of the variance in existing muscle mass. A twin study estimated that about 53% of the variance in lean body mass is heritable, along with about 45% of the variance in muscle fiber proportion.

=== Testosterone ===
Testosterone helps to increase muscle hypertrophy.

During puberty in males, hypertrophy occurs at an increased rate. Natural hypertrophy normally stops at full growth in the late teens. As testosterone is one of the body's major growth hormones, on average, males find hypertrophy much easier (on an absolute scale) to achieve than females. On average, men have about 60% more muscle mass than women.

Taking additional testosterone, as in anabolic steroids, will increase results, but also the risks. Drugs such as these can lead to a decrease in natural hormone levels, leaving the user dependent on the drug for continued chemical release and gains. It is considered a performance-enhancing drug, the use of which can cause competitors to be suspended or banned from competitions. Testosterone is also a medically regulated substance in most countries, making it illegal to possess without a medical prescription. Anabolic steroid use can cause testicular atrophy, cardiac arrest, and gynecomastia.

=== Diet ===
In the long term, a positive energy balance, when more calories are consumed rather than burned, is helpful for anabolism and therefore muscle hypertrophy. An increased requirement for protein can help elevate protein synthesis, which is seen in athletes training for muscle hypertrophy. Protein intakes up to 1.6 grams per kilogram of body weight a day help increase gains in strength and muscle size from resistance training.

=== Glycogen ===
When performing high intensity exercise, such as weight training, the body will attempt to draw energy from glycogen stores for energy. Glycogen is produced during glycogenesis and is converted from carbohydrates into glycogen and is stored in the muscles and liver for energy. Cyclist studies have shown that when cycling at a VO2 (volume of oxygen) rate of 85%, glycogen was responsible for roughly 66% of the energy expended. Having low glycogen stores during a high intensity workout can cause issues with performance, energy, and can even lead to lightheadedness. It is also beneficial to replenish the glycogen that has been used during a workout. Incorporating carbs into a post-workout meal, along with other macro and micronutrients, can aid in recovery.

== Training factors affecting hypertrophy ==
Training variables, in the context of strength training, such as frequency, intensity, and total volume all directly affect the increase of muscle hypertrophy. Time under tension and contraction types (eccentric versus concentric) affect hypertrophy as well. A gradual increase in all of these training variables will yield muscular hypertrophy.

Resistance training activates key anabolic pathways. Many crucial ones to hypertrophy include mTORC1 that stimulate satellite cell activity, both of which play central roles in promoting increases in muscle fiber size.

=== Range of motion ===
Range of motion (ROM) is also seen as another possible factor to induce hypertrophy. Training through a full ROM, particularly at elongated muscle lengths, has been shown to enhance hypertrophy compared to partial ROM. For example, deep squats and full-ROM deadlifts increase mechanical tension on muscle fibers, particularly in the stretched position, which may stimulate greater muscle growth. Partial ROM training at longer muscle lengths has also been found to promote hypertrophy, potentially due to increased muscle damage.

=== Time under tension ===
Time under tension (TUT) is the duration of time that the muscle being trained is stressed during a repetition. There are multiple methods to introduce TUT in each repetition of an exercise, either by slowing down the eccentric or concentric phases, or by stopping at certain phases of the exercise. TUT has been proposed to increase muscle hypertrophy because slower repetition tempos increase muscular activity. Research comparing repetition tempos shows mixed results. Burd et al. (2012) reported that slower tempos increased acute mitochondrial and myofibrillar protein synthesis, while other studies found that traditional tempos produced greater hypertrophy in untrained individuals, suggesting that moderate tempos may be most effective. This can increase the muscle protein synthesis for an extended period. A study done by Burd et al. (2012) showed that at relatively light loads (30% of best effort) slow contractions (6-second concentric and 6-second eccentric) performed to failure compared to faster contractions (1-second concentric and 1-second eccentric), slow contractions had not only higher rates of acute mitochondrial and sarcoplasmic protein synthesis but also had significant rates of delayed stimulation of myofibrillar protein synthesis 24 to 30 hours after the exercise was done.

However, other research conflicts with this information. In a study done by Shneuke et al., groups of "untrained" individuals underwent slow-speed training (10-second concentric and 4-second eccentric) and normal-speed training. The slow-speed group had some increases in type IIA and IIX fibers, but the greatest increases occurred in the normal-speed group. This shows that although TUT can have some adaptations in fibers, load and intensity are more important for hypertrophy.

The literature suggests that moderate tempos give the best results for hypertrophy (between 2 and 8 seconds), while extremely slow tempos may restrict hypertrophy by limiting the amount of load that can be lifted, limiting progressive overload. On the other hand, very rapid tempos shorten TUT and reduce the stimulus a muscle receives for hypertrophic adaptation.

Overall, while TUT has shown some positive benefits in terms of muscle growth, long-term hypertrophy seems to depend more on total training volume and progressive overload than on repetition duration only.

There has also been a focus on emphasizing the eccentric portion of the repetition to increase muscle growth.

=== Eccentric contraction emphasis ===
Main Article: Eccentric training

An eccentric contraction occurs when a muscle lengthens under tension. This is different from concentric contraction, which is when the muscle producing force shortens. For example, during the lowering phase of squat or bench press, the external load is greater than the muscle's force output, and so the fibers lengthen under tension. Lifting the weight back up requires the muscles to have a higher force output than the external load, resulting in fibers shortening in the concentric phase.

The primary way that the eccentric contraction promotes hypertrophy is that it produces higher mechanical output at lower metabolic cost when compared to the concentric contraction. This higher mechanical tension is considered essential for growth. Additionally, eccentric exercise causes a significant increase in exercise-induced muscle damage (EIMD), as seen by the microlesions in muscle fibers, sarcolemmal disruption, and an inflammatory response that leads to delayed-onset muscle soreness (DOMS).

There is also evidence to support that eccentric contractions activate specific molecular pathways, which cause greater anabolic signaling and gene expression than concentric contractions. This is shown in the structural remodeling differences in the muscle when comparing the two training contractions. Eccentric training seems to cause a greater increase in fascicle length (sacromeres are added in series), while concentric training leads to an increase in the pennation angle (sacromeres are added in parallel).

One 8-week study found that subjects training with the same intensity, one with primarily eccentric contractions, increased muscle fiber mass by approximately 40%, while the concentric contraction group showed no change. However, this difference might not be the same when the total load is matched between training types. When matched for load, the increase in muscle volume seems to be the same between concentric and eccentric training.

The concept of eccentric overload, where the eccentric phase is loaded with more weight than the concentric phase, is a strategy that advanced lifters use to maximize hypertrophic stimulus. This method works because of the unique properties of the eccentric phase mentioned above. Due to the low metabolic cost relative to the high force production, eccentric exercise is also used for rehabilitation training, especially for elderly patients with chronic conditions who are unable to perform strenuous activity.

Collectively, the evidence suggests that eccentric contractions can produce substantial muscle hypertrophy due to the high force production and unique molecular signaling. It might not be superior to concentric training if matched for total load and reps.

== Changes in protein synthesis and muscle cell biology associated with stimuli ==
=== Protein synthesis ===
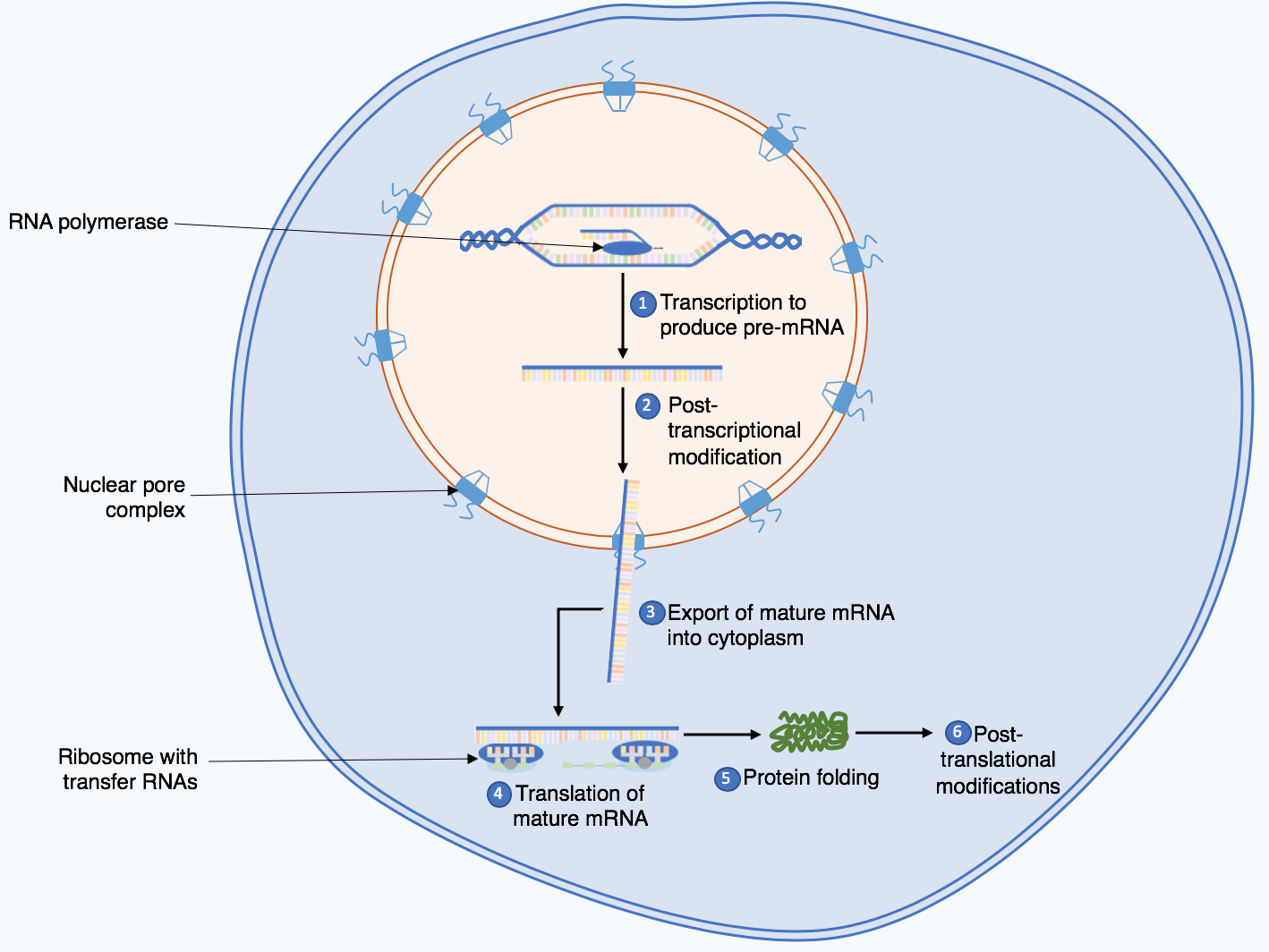
Protein biosynthesis starting with transcription and post-transcriptional modifications in the nucleus. Then the mature mRNA is exported to the cytoplasm where it is translated. The polypeptide chain then folds and is post-translationally modified.

The message filters down to alter the pattern of gene expression. The additional contractile proteins appear to be incorporated into existing myofibrils (the chains of sarcomeres within a muscle cell). There appears to be some limit to how large a myofibril can become: at some point, they split. These events appear to occur within each muscle fiber. That is hypertrophy results primarily from the growth of each muscle cell rather than an increase in the number of cells. Skeletal muscle cells are however unique in the body in that they can contain multiple nuclei, and the number of nuclei can increase.

Cortisol decreases amino acid uptake by muscle tissue, and inhibits protein synthesis. The short-term increase in protein synthesis that occurs subsequent to resistance training returns to normal after approximately 28 hours in adequately fed male youths. Another study determined that muscle protein synthesis was elevated even 72 hours following training.

A small study performed on young and elderly people found that ingestion of 340 grams of lean beef (90 g of protein) did not increase muscle protein synthesis any more than ingestion of 113 grams of lean beef (30 g of protein). In both groups, muscle protein synthesis increased by 50%. The study concluded that more than 30 g of protein in a single meal did not further enhance the stimulation of muscle protein synthesis in young and elderly. However, this study did not check protein synthesis in relation to training, therefore conclusions from this research are controversial. A 2018 review of the scientific literature concluded that for the purpose of building lean muscle tissue, a minimum of 1.6 g of protein per kilogram of body weight is required, which can, for example, be divided over 4 meals or snacks and spread out over the day.

It is not uncommon for bodybuilders to advise a protein intake as high as 2–4 g per kilogram of bodyweight per day. However, scientific literature has suggested this is higher than necessary, as protein intakes greater than 1.8 g per kilogram of body weight showed to have no greater effect on muscle hypertrophy. A study carried out by American College of Sports Medicine (2002) put the recommended daily protein intake for athletes at 1.2–1.8 g per kilogram of body weight. Conversely, Di Pasquale (2008), citing recent studies, recommends a minimum protein intake of 2.2 g/kg "for anyone involved in competitive or intense recreational sports who wants to maximize lean body mass but does not wish to gain weight. However, athletes involved in strength events [...] may need even more to maximize body composition and athletic performance. In those attempting to minimize body fat and thus maximize body composition, for example in sports with weight classes and in bodybuilding, it's possible that protein may well make up over 50% of their daily caloric intake."

=== Microtrauma ===
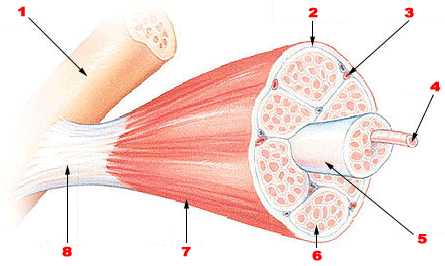
Muscle fibres may be "microtorn" during microtrauma

Microtrauma is tiny damage to the muscle fibers. The precise relation between microtrauma and muscle growth is not entirely understood yet.

One theory is that microtrauma plays a significant role in muscle growth. When microtrauma occurs (from weight training or other strenuous activities), the body responds by overcompensating, replacing the damaged tissue and adding more, so that the risk of repeat damage is reduced. Damage to these fibers has been theorized as the possible cause for the symptoms of delayed onset muscle soreness (DOMS), and is why progressive overload is essential to continued improvement, as the body adapts and becomes more resistant to stress.

Although micro trauma does occur during resistance training, it correlates poorly with the magnitude of hypertrophy. Recent research indicates that muscle damage itself is not the primary driver of hypertrophy; instead, protein synthesis increases during the repair phase following training, which contributes more directly to muscle growth. In fact, in one study the authors showed that it was not until the damage subsided that protein synthesis was directed to muscle growth.

== Myofibrillar vs. sarcoplasmic hypertrophy ==
Hypertrophy of cell

In the bodybuilding and fitness community and even in some academic books skeletal muscle hypertrophy is described as being either sarcoplasmic or myofibrillar. According to this hypothesis, during sarcoplasmic hypertrophy, the volume of sarcoplasmic fluid in the muscle cell increases with no accompanying increase in muscular strength, whereas during myofibrillar hypertrophy, actin and myosin contractile proteins increase in number and add to muscular strength as well as a small increase in the size of the muscle. Sarcoplasmic hypertrophy is greater in the muscles of bodybuilders because studies suggest sarcoplasmic hypertrophy shows a greater increase in muscle size while myofibrillar hypertrophy proves to increase overall muscular strength making it more dominant in Olympic weightlifters. These two forms of adaptations rarely occur completely independently of one another; one can experience a large increase in fluid with a slight increase in proteins, a large increase in proteins with a small increase in fluid, or a relatively balanced combination of the two.

== In sports ==
Examples of the increased muscle hypertrophy are seen in various professional sports, mainly strength related sports such as boxing, olympic weightlifting, mixed martial arts, rugby, professional wrestling and various forms of gymnastics. Athletes in other more skill-based sports such as basketball, baseball, ice hockey, and football may also train for increased muscle hypertrophy to better suit their position of play. For example, a center (basketball) may want to be bigger and more muscular to better overpower their opponents in the low post. Athletes training for these sports train extensively not only in strength but also in cardiovascular and muscular endurance training.

== Pathology ==
Some neuromuscular diseases result in true hypertrophy of one or more skeletal muscles, confirmed by MRI or muscle biopsy. As this muscle hypertrophy is not the result of resistance training nor heavy manual labor, the muscle hypertrophy is described as a pseudoathletic appearance.

As muscle hypertrophy is a response to strenuous anaerobic activity, ordinary everyday activity would become strenuous in diseases that result in premature muscle fatigue (neural or metabolic), or disrupt the excitation-contraction coupling in muscle, or cause repetitive or sustained involuntary muscle contractions (fasciculations, myotonia, or spasticity). In lipodystrophy, an abnormal deficit of subcutaneous fat accentuates the appearance of the muscles, though the muscles are quantifiably hypertrophic (possibly due to a metabolic abnormality).

Diseases that result in true muscle hypertrophy include, but not limited to, select: muscular dystrophies, metabolic myopathies, endocrine myopathies, congenital myopathies, non-dystrophic myotonias and pseudomyotonias, denervation, spasticity, and lipodystrophy. The muscle hypertrophy may persist throughout the course of the disease, or may later atrophy, or become pseudohypertrophic (muscle atrophy with infiltration of fat or other tissue). For instance, Duchenne and Becker muscular dystrophy may start as true muscle hypertrophy, but later develop into pseudohypertrophy.

== See also ==
- Anabolism
- Colorado Experiment
- Davis' law
- Follistatin
- Lean body mass
- Muscle atrophy
- Muscle dystrophy
- Myostatin
- Pseudoathletic appearance
- Pseudohypertrophy
