= Syndromic autism =

Autism associated with another medical condition

Syndromic autism (or syndromic autism spectrum disorder) denotes cases of autism that are associated with a broader medical condition, generally a syndrome. Cases without such association, which account for the majority of total autism cases, are known as non-syndromic autism, non-syndromic autism spectrum disorder, or idiopathic autism.

Studying the differences and similarities (e.g., common pathways) between syndromic and non-syndromic cases can provide insights about the pathophysiology of autism and pave the way to new autism therapies.

Syndromic autism represents about 25% of the total ASD cases. In most cases, its etiology is known. Monogenic disorders are one of the causes of syndromic autism, which in this case are also known as monogenic autism spectrum disorders. They account for about 5% of the total ASD cases. SCN2A is the leading monogenic cause of autism.

== Classification ==
A 2017 study proposed to replace the classification syndromic/non-syndromic ASD into one based on the genetic etiology of the condition, specifying if the syndromic condition occurs in the context of a "phenotype first" clinically defined syndrome or from a "genotype first" molecularly defined syndrome.

Following the proposal, ASD would be divided into genetic categories, including:

=== Clinically defined ===
Syndromes recognized by clinicians (depending on their experience), typically confirmed by a targeted genetic testing.

- Chromosomal (e.g., Down syndrome)
- Syndromes caused by mutations in single genes (e.g., SCN2A-related autism, NF1 mutation, tuberous sclerosis, PTEN-associated macrocephaly syndrome, some males with fragile X syndrome)
- Syndromes caused by CNVs (e.g., DiGeorge syndrome)
- Teratogens (e.g., fetal valproate spectrum disorder)

=== Molecularly defined ===
Syndromes recognized by genome-wide testing, not by hypothesis-driven testing (since clinical recognition is difficult).

- Chromosomal (e.g., isodicentric 15q)
- Autism-associated genes (e.g., ADNP, ARIDB1B, ANK2, SCN2A, KCNH1)
- Autism-associated CNVs (e.g., 16p11.2 deletion/duplication, exonic NRXN1 deletions)

Characteristics of syndromic ASD conditions
Condition	Cause	Chromosome(s) involved (if a mutation)	ASD prevalence (95% CI)	Clinically/Molecularly defined	Other characteristics	Ref.
Fragile X syndrome	Monogenic disorder: FMR1 (encodes FMRP)	X	30% (20.0–31.0) [male individuals only] 22% (15.0–30.0) [mixed sex] 14% (13–18) [female individuals only]	Clinically defined [in some males]	Long/narrow face, macroorchidism, long ears and philtrum, hyperactivity, mild to moderate intellectual disability (ID), seizures	
Rett syndrome	Monogenic disorder: MECP2	X	61.0% (46.0–74.0) [female individuals only]	Clinically defined	Microcephaly, breathing irregularities, language deficits, repetitive/stereotyped hand movements, epilepsy, ID	
MECP2 duplication syndrome	Monogenic disorder: MECP2	X	100% [in a single study composed by 9 male participants]	Clinically defined	Brachycephaly, spasticity, recurrent respiratory infections, gastrointestinal hypermotility, genitourinary abnormalities, epilepsy, ID	
Tuberous sclerosis complex	Monogenic disorder: TSC1; TSC2	9; 16	36.0% (33.0–40.0)	Clinically defined	Benign tumours in multiple organs, epilepsy	
Angelman's syndrome	Monogenic disorder: UBE3A	15	34.0% (24.0–37.0)		Cheerful demeanour, microcephaly, speech deficits, sleep disturbance, epilepsy, ID	
Phelan-McDermid syndrome	Monogenic disorder: SHANK3	22	84% [in a single study composed by 32 participants]	Molecularly defined		
KCNH1-related disorders	Monogenic disorder: KCNH1	1		Molecularly defined, formerly clinically defined as Temple–Baraitser Syndrome or Zimmermann–Laband Syndrome	Mild to severe developmental delay, profound intellectual disability, neonatal hypotonia, myopathic facial appearance, and infantile-onset seizures	
Timothy syndrome	Monogenic disorder: CACNA1C	12	80% [in a single study composed by 17 participants]	Clinically defined		
Smith-Lemli-Opitz syndrome	Monogenic disorder: DHCR7	11	55% [in a single study composed by 33 participants]			
Neurofibromatosis type I	Monogenic disorder: NF1	17	18% (9.0–29.0)	Clinically defined		
PTEN hamartoma tumor syndrome	Monogenic disorder: PTEN	10	17% (8–27)	Clinically defined		
Down syndrome	Chromosomal disorder: trisomy 21	21	16% (8.0–24.0)	Clinically defined		
Cohen's syndrome	Monogenic disorder: VPS13B	8	54% (44.0–64.0)	Clinically defined		
Cornelia de Lange syndrome	Polygenic disorder		43% (32.0–53.0)	Clinically defined		
CHARGE syndrome	Monogenic disorder: CHD7	8	28% (16–41)	Clinically defined		
Noonan's syndrome	Polygenic disorder		15% (7.0–26.0)			
Williams syndrome	Microdeletion syndrome: 7q11.23	7	12% (6.0–20.0)			
22q11.2 deletion syndrome	Microdeletion syndrome: 22q11.2	22	11% (5.0–19.0)	Clinically defined		
Fetal valproate spectrum disorder	Teratogen: valproate		8–15% [in VPA exposed children]	Clinically defined		

== See also ==
- Causes of autism
- Conditions comorbid to autism
