= Channelopathy =

Diseases caused by dysfunction of ion channels or related proteins

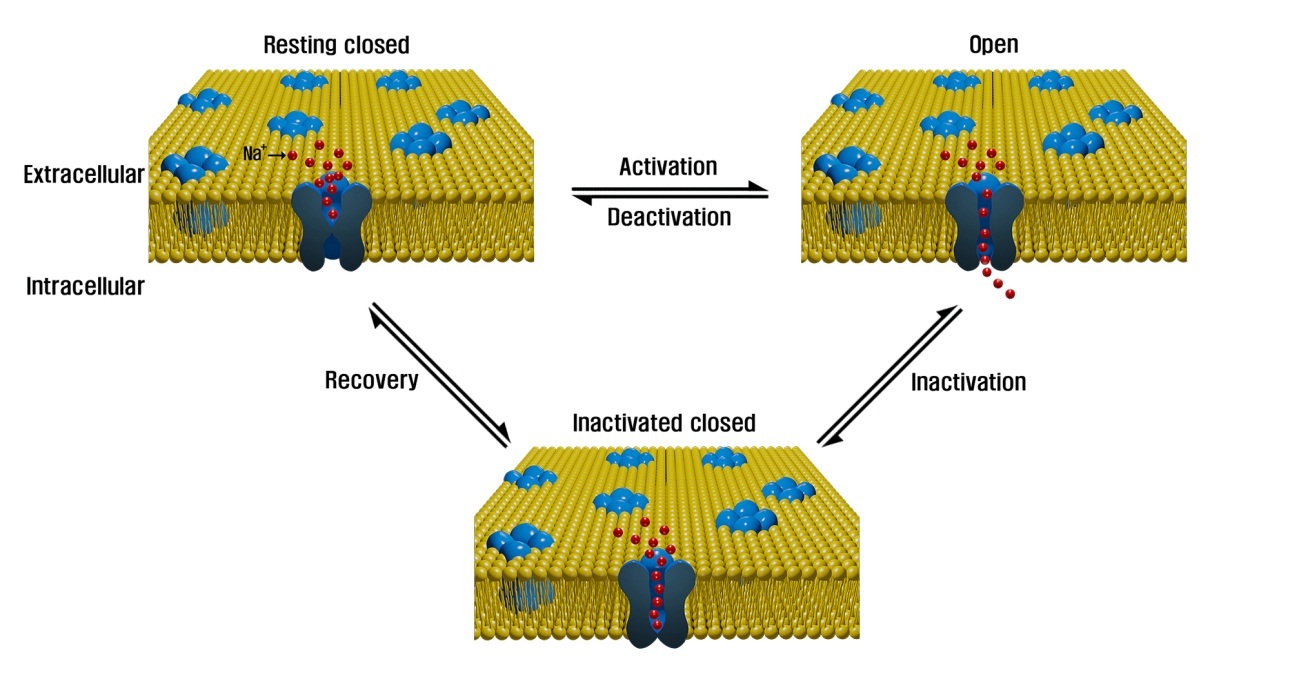
- Sodium channel, implicated in channelopathies including Brugada syndrome, long QT syndrome, Dravet syndrome, paramyotonia congenita
- Specialty: Medical genetics, neuromuscular medicine, cardiology
- Symptoms: Dependent on type. Include: Syncope, muscle weakness, seizures, breathlessness
- Complications: Dependent on type. Include: Sudden death
- Causes: Genetic variants

Channelopathies are a group of diseases caused by the dysfunction of ion channel subunits or their interacting proteins. These diseases can be inherited or acquired by other disorders, drugs, or toxins. Mutations in genes encoding ion channels, which impair channel function, are the most common cause of channelopathies. There are more than 400 genes that encode ion channels, found in all human cell types and are involved in almost all physiological processes.

Channels are typically formed as complexes of several individual, often identical or homologous, proteins. Depending on the type and location of the mutation, it may lead to (partial) loss of function, affect gating, conductance, ion selectivity, or signal transduction of the channel. Gain of function variants in channels are also associated with several diseases, and a key target for knockdown genetic therapies.

Channelopathies can be categorized based on the organ system which they are associated with. In the cardiovascular system, the electrical impulse needed for each heartbeat is made possible by the electrochemical gradient of each heart cell. Because the heartbeat is dependent on the proper movement of ions across the surface membrane, cardiac channelopathies make up a key group of heart diseases. Long QT syndrome, the most common form of cardiac channelopathy, is characterized by prolonged ventricular repolarization, predisposing to a high risk of ventricular tachyarrhythmias (e.g., torsade de pointes), syncope, and sudden cardiac death.

The channelopathies of human skeletal muscle include hyper- and hypokalemic (high and low potassium blood concentrations) periodic paralysis, myotonia congenita and paramyotonia congenita.

Channelopathies affecting synaptic function are a type of synaptopathy.

== Causes ==
=== Genetic ===
Mutations in genes encoding ion channels, which cause defects in channel function, are the most common cause of channelopathies. Non-coding changes can also result in channelopathy. Changes in the promoter region, binding site of transcription factors and at splice sites are known to be causative for several epilepsies.

=== Acquired ===
Channelopathies can develop due to:

- Autoantibodies, like in anti-NMDA receptor encephalitis
- Transcriptional regulation, for example in response to drugs or traumatic brain injury
- Post-transcriptional regulation
- Genetic predisposition in combination with environmental factors

== Types ==
The types in the following table are commonly accepted. Channelopathies currently under research, like Kir4.1 potassium channel in multiple sclerosis, are not included.

Condition	Channel type
Bartter syndrome	various, by type
Brugada syndrome	various, by type
CACNA1C-related disorders	Voltage-gated calcium channel
Catecholaminergic polymorphic ventricular tachycardia (CPVT)	Ryanodine receptor
Congenital hyperinsulinism	Inward-rectifier potassium ion channel
Cystic fibrosis	Chloride channel, CFTR
Dravet syndrome	Voltage-gated sodium channel
Epilepsy	various, including: sodium, potassium, calcium, chloride channels, GABA_{A} receptors, ionotropic glutamate receptors, nicotinic acetylcholine receptors and hyperpolarization-activated cyclic nucleotide-gated channels
Episodic ataxia	Voltage-gated potassium channel
Erythromelalgia	Voltage-gated sodium channel
Generalized epilepsy with febrile seizures plus	Voltage-gated sodium channel
Familial hemiplegic migraine	various
Associated with one particular disabling form of fibromyalgia	Voltage-gated sodium channel
Hyperkalemic periodic paralysis	Voltage-gated sodium channel
Hypokalemic periodic paralysis	Voltage-gated sodium channel or Voltage-dependent calcium channel (calciumopathy)
KCNH1-related disorders	Voltage-gated potassium channel, KCNH1
KCNT1-related epilepsy	Voltage-gated potassium channel, KCNT1
Lambert–Eaton myasthenic syndrome	Voltage-gated calcium channel
Long QT syndrome main type Romano-Ward syndrome	various, by type
Malignant hyperthermia	Ligand-gated calcium channel
Mucolipidosis type IV	Non-selective cation channel
Myotonia congenita	Voltage-dependent chloride channel
Neuromyelitis optica	Aquaporin-4 water channel
Neuromyotonia	Voltage-gated potassium channel
Nonsyndromic deafness	various
Paramyotonia congenita (a periodic paralysis)	Voltage-gated sodium channel
Polymicrogyria (brain malformation)	Voltage-gated sodium channel, SCN3A ATP1A3
Retinitis pigmentosa (some forms)	Ligand-gated non-specific ion channels
SCN2A-related disorders	Voltage-gated sodium channel, SCN2A
Short QT syndrome	various potassium channels suspected
Temple–Baraitser syndrome	Voltage-gated potassium channel, KCNH1
Timothy syndrome	Voltage-dependent calcium channel
Tinnitus	Voltage-gated potassium channel of the KCNQ family
Seizure	Voltage-dependent potassium channel
Zimmermann–Laband syndrome, type1	Voltage-gated potassium channel, KCNH1

=== Ion channels versus ion pumps ===
Both channels and pumps are ion transporters which move ions across membranes. Channels move ions quickly, through passive transport, down electrical and concentration gradients (moving "downhilll"); whereas pumps move ions slowly, through active transport, building-up gradients (moving "uphill"). Historically the difference between the two seemed cut and dried; however, recent research has shown that in some ion transporters, it is not always clear whether it functions as a channel or a pump.

Diseases involving ion pumps can produce symptoms similar to channelopathies, as they both involve the movement of ions across membranes. Brody disease (also known as Brody myopathy) includes symptoms similar to myotonia congenita, including muscle stiffness and cramping after initiating exercise (delayed muscle relaxation). However, it is pseudo-myotonia as those with Brody disease have normal EMG.

Due to similar symptoms, different genes for both channels and pumps can be associated with the same disease. For instance, polymicrogyria has been associated with the channel gene SCN3A and the pump gene ATP1A3, among other genes that are not ion transporters.

== See also ==
- ATPase (ion pumps)

== Bibliography ==
- Song YW, Kim SJ, Heo TH, Kim MH, Kim JB (December 2012). "Normokalemic periodic paralysis is not a distinct disease". Muscle & Nerve. 46 (6): 914–916. doi:10.1002/mus.23441. PMID 22926674. S2CID 43821573.
