= O'Donnell-Luria–Rodan syndrome =

Rare genetic disorder

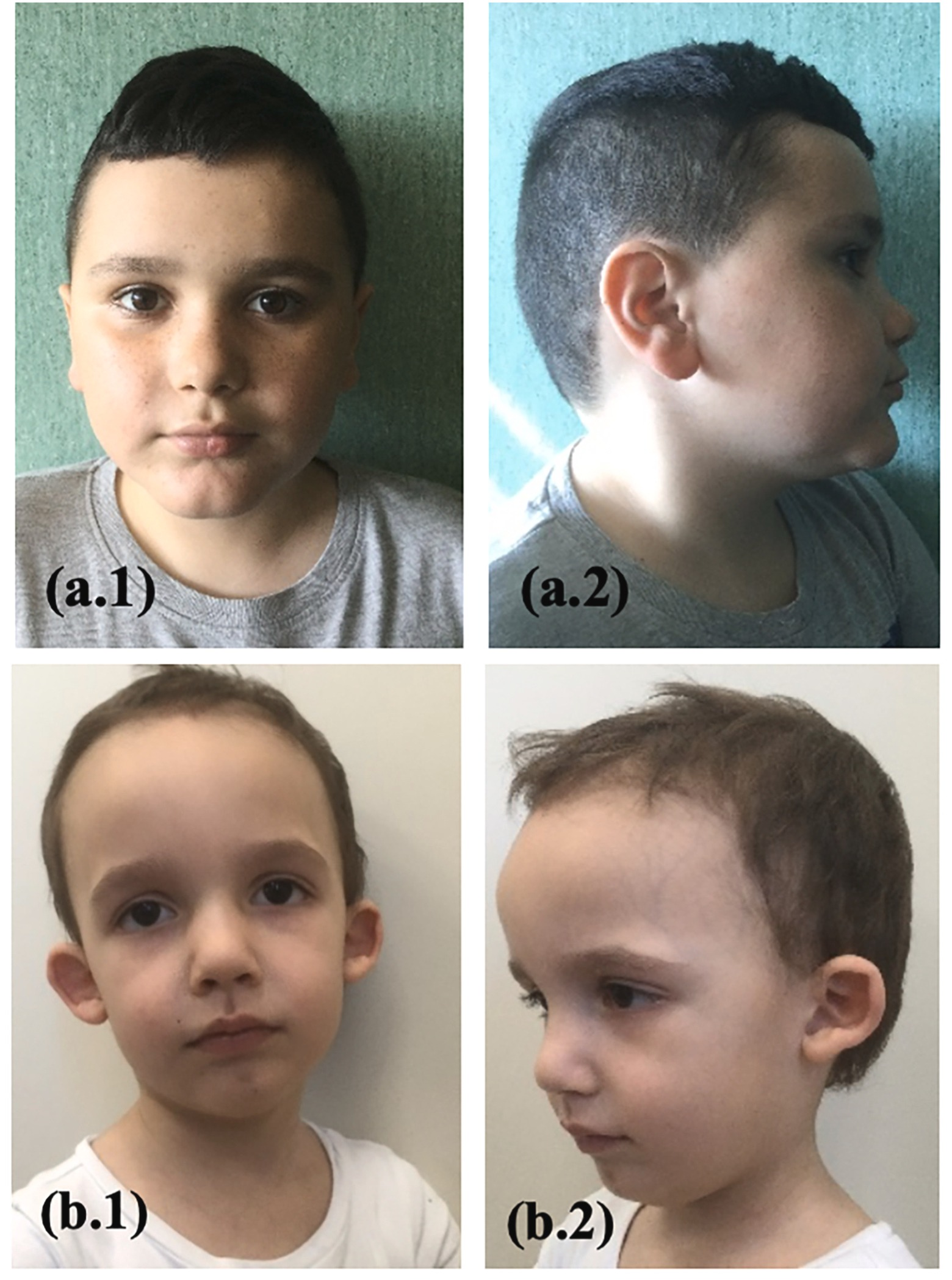
- Features can include large head size, prominent forehead, cheeks and nasolabial folds, deep-set eyes, and downslanting palpebral fissures (only image b).
- Specialty: Medical genetics and genomics

O'Donnell-Luria–Rodan syndrome is an ultra-rare genetic disorder caused by pathogenic variants of the KMT2E gene. The clinical features generally include developmental delay, intellectual disability, decreased muscle tone, sleep disturbances, syndromic autism and seizures. The syndrome occurs due to insufficient levels of an enzyme involved in neuronal gene expression and cell cycle regulation. The condition can occur spontaneously (de novo) or be inherited in an autosomal dominant manner.

Several genetic diseases share symptoms with O'Donnell-Luria–Rodan syndrome. The disease is diagnosed using genetic and genomic testing in suspected individuals with characteristic presentation. Approach to management is supportive—aimed at improving quality of life—and consists of early interventions, special education and anti-seizure medications. It was first delineated in 2019 and around 120 individuals have been diagnosed with the condition as of 2025.

== Presentation ==
Almost all individuals with O'Donnell-Luria–Rodan syndrome have neurodevelopmental symptoms of global developmental delay and mild-to-moderate intellectual disability. Children can have delays in achieving developmental milestones and motor skills; for example, the average age of walking and speaking first words is around 20 months (compared to around 12 months for unaffected children). Physical growth is typically not affected, with normal height and weight. Delays in speech are common, although most eventually develop verbal communication. In rare cases, speech regression can occur or individuals may remain nonverbal. Speech can be further complicated by velopharyngeal dysfunction. Children may have decreased muscle tone, which improves with age but does not fully resolve; this may cause feeding difficulties in infancy and constipation. Additional gastrointestinal issues include vomiting and reflux.

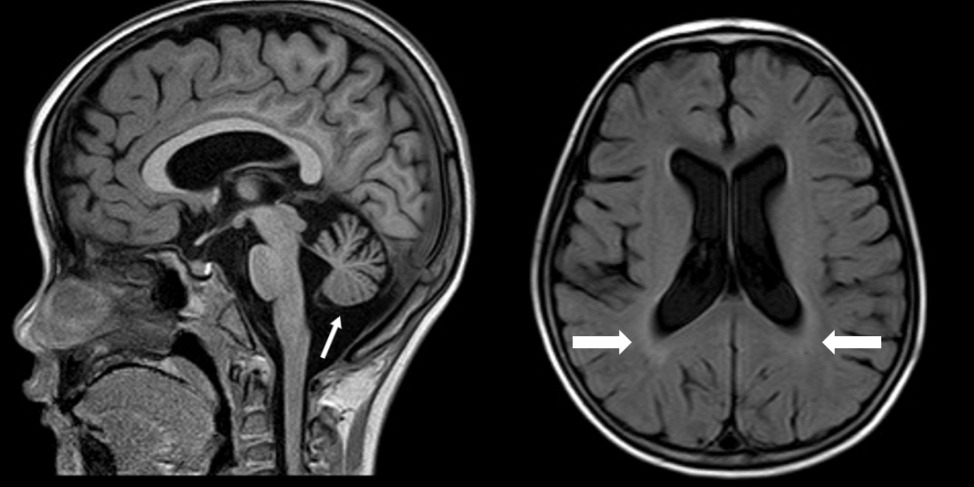
Brain MRI of an individual with O'Donnell-Luria–Rodan syndrome showing cerebellar volume loss (left; arrow) and white matter hyperintensities (right; arrows). These changes are not specific to the condition and can also be seen in several other diseases.

Some affected individuals may have syndromic autism; this is more common in males than females. Behavioral abnormalities such as aggression, anxiety, repetitive movements, self-harm and skin-picking are sometimes present. Problems with executive functioning are common, including difficulties with flexible thinking and working memory. Less commonly, individuals may have attention deficit hyperactivity disorder. About one-third of people with O'Donnell-Luria–Rodan syndrome experience seizures; this affects females more than males. Seizure severity varies; in severe cases, drug-resistant epilepsy and seizures causing neonatal encephalopathy have been reported. Approximately half of affected individuals have difficulty falling asleep and experience frequent awakenings.

No distinct physical features are consistently associated with O'Donnell-Luria–Rodan syndrome. However, reported features include long head and large forehead, prominent cheeks and nasolabial fold, deep-set and puffy eyes, downslanting palpebral fissures, and hyperflexible joints. Most have a larger head size, but some can have a smaller head size. Rarely, individuals can have heart defects, kyphosis, tapering fingers and undescended testis. Neuroimaging can be normal or show benign brain abnormalities such as thin corpus callosum, white matter hyperintensities, reduced cerebral and cerebellar volume.

== Mechanism ==
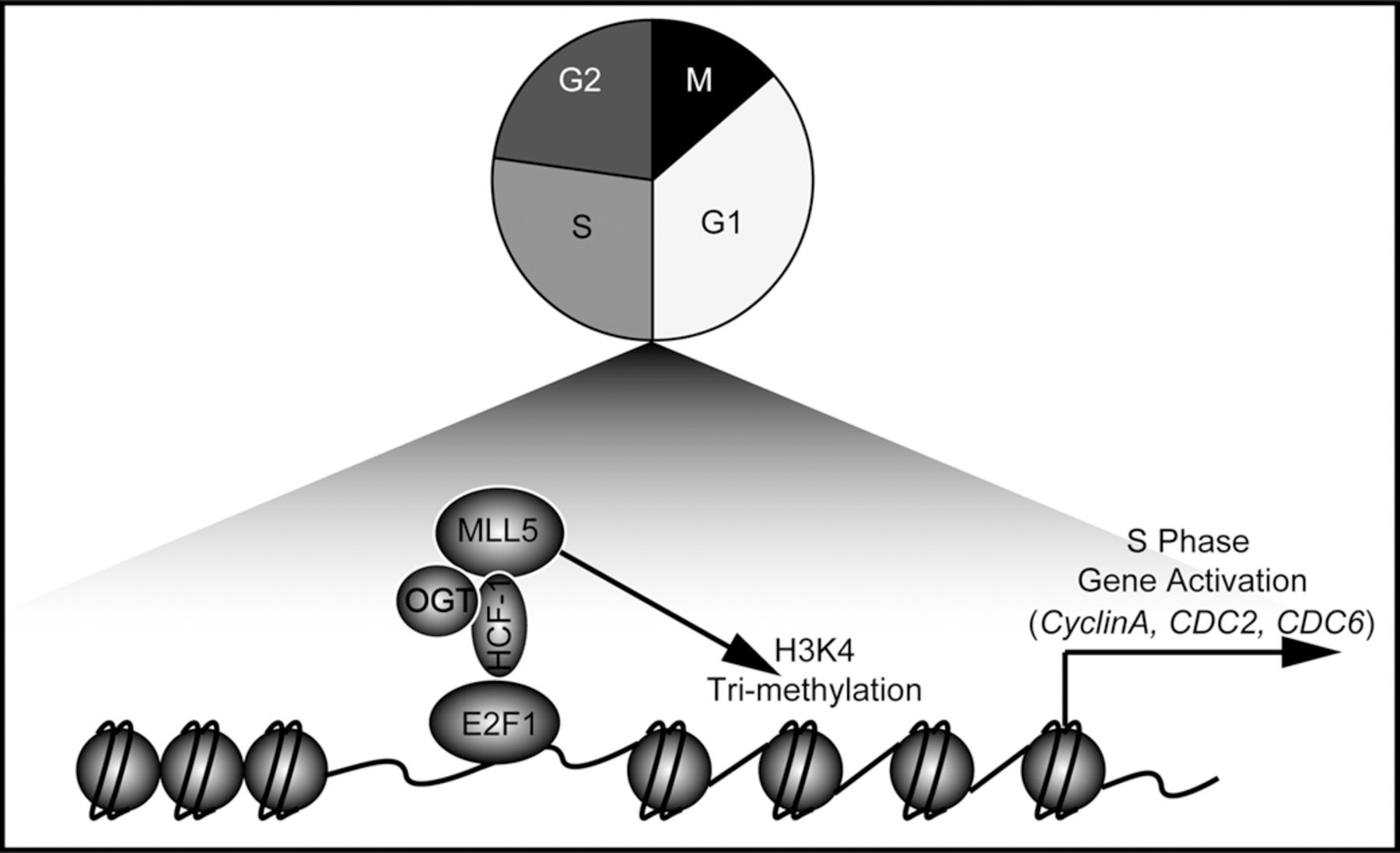
A complex containing MLL5, HCF-1, OGT and E2F1 binds to promoters (such as cyclin A, CDC2 and CDC6) of gene transcription for cell cycle regulation. This binding promotes H3K4me3, which then leads to gene expression and cell cycle progression from the G_{1} to S phase.

The KMT2E gene on chromosome 7 (7q22.3) provides instructions for making histone-lysine N-methyltransferase 2E (also known as MLL5), a histone-modifying enzyme widely produced by most human cells. MLL5 forms a protein complex with host cell factor C1 (HCF-1) and protein O-GlcNAc transferase (OGT), which then interacts with transcription factor E2F1 (E2F1). This interaction contributes to H3K4me3, an epigenetic modification in which histone 3 (H3) is tri-methylated (me3) at the fourth lysine position (K4).

Methylation at H3K4 is necessary to have an open chromatin, which is consequently essential for gene transcription. H3K4me3 leads to gene expression, promoting cell cycle progression from the G_{1} to S phase. MLL5 also mediates cell transition from G_{2} phase to mitosis, and sustains the spindle apparatus during the latter. Furthermore, the enzyme helps maintain the structure and accuracy of the genome through the cell cycle. Processes involving MLL5 are active during development of the nervous system and in the cerebral cortex where they influence the local environment around neurons and supporting neuroglia.

O'Donnell-Luria–Rodan syndrome is caused by pathogenic or likely pathogenic variants of the KMT2E gene, disrupting the function of MLL5. These can occur due to missense, nonsense, frameshift, protein-truncating or splice-site changes in the gene. Only a single abnormal KMT2E gene copy is needed to cause the disease, hence the condition is hypothesized to occur due to haploinsufficiency—in which the remaining normal copy does not produce enough protein for proper function. As a result, the syndrome follows an autosomal dominant inheritance pattern, and an affected individual has a 50% chance of passing it on to each offspring. However, most reported cases in the medical literature have been de novo, meaning the variants arose spontaneously and were not inherited from either parent.

Individuals with a missense pathogenic variant in the KMT2E gene tend to have a more significant disease presentation compared to other variant types. This presents as more severe seizures, and a higher prevalence of drug-resistant epilepsy. They also more often have a smaller than average head size—contrary to the larger than average head size more commonly seen with O'Donnell-Luria–Rodan syndrome—and more severe intellectual disability.

== Diagnosis ==
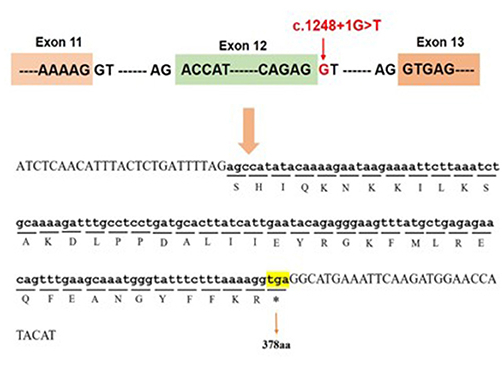
A splice site pathogenic variant (c.1248+1G>T) next to exon 12 of the KMT2E gene causes exon 12 to be skipped during RNA splicing, joining exon 11 directly to exon 13 (instead of exon 12). This creates a premature stop codon (amino acid position 378) in the gene's protein product, rendering it nonfunctional and causing O'Donnell-Luria–Rodan syndrome. Such variants may be missed by most genetic tests but can be detected by genome sequencing.

O'Donnell-Luria–Rodan syndrome shares clinical findings with several genetic disorders. These include Kabuki syndrome, Wiedemann–Steiner syndrome and other genetic syndromes with intellectual disability. Genetic testing typically begins with chromosomal microarray analysis using SNP array or oligonucleotide. If that is nondiagnostic, further testing may include an intellectual disability multigene panel that includes the KMT2E gene or comprehensive genomic testing such as exome or genome sequencing. While exome sequencing is the most commonly used method, genome sequencing can also be used to assess noncoding regions affecting gene regulation or splicing and identifying structural variants that can be missed by exome sequencing.

There is no consensus on diagnostic criteria for O'Donnell-Luria–Rodan syndrome. Diagnosis involves confirming the presence of a pathogenic or likely pathogenic KMT2E gene variant in an individual with typical clinical characteristics. When a variant of uncertain significance (VUS) is found, testing of the parents may help decide whether the variant is de novo or inherited. A new VUS in presence of clinical features or one inherited from an affected parent supports the diagnosis; conversely, a VUS inherited from an unaffected parent may suggest it is a benign variant—not causing the disease.

== Management ==
Management of O'Donnell-Luria–Rodan syndrome is supportive, and focuses on addressing the individual's specific symptoms and developmental needs to improve their quality of life. Head circumference and developmental milestones are monitored periodically. Children with developmental delays are referred for early interventions and special education, which may involve physical therapy to work on motor skills, occupational therapy to improve on daily functioning and speech therapy to support language development.

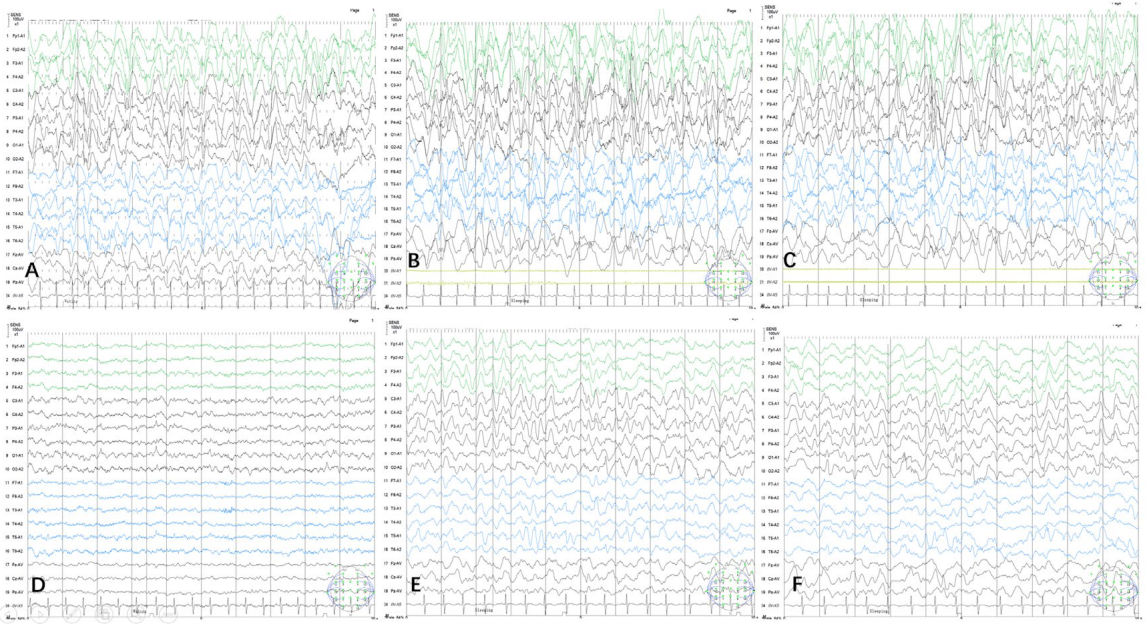
EEG of a 5-month-old with O'Donnell-Luria–Rodan syndrome with seizures (A; B; C). Normal EEG after treatment with anti-seizure medications (D; E; F).

In cases of persistent feeding difficulties, a feeding tube placement may become necessary. If seizures are suspected, further evaluation with electroencephalography (EEG) and brain MRI may be performed. Because seizure types vary from person to person, selection of anti-seizure medications is personalized based on the type and severity of seizures.

Specialists routinely involved in care include physician geneticists, developmental pediatricians and neurologists. Genetic counselors help families in assessing risk of other family members having the disorder and explore options for family planning and prenatal testing. Palliative care and social work can further assist in exploring options for family support and nursing home placements.

== History ==
Studies published between 2012 and 2016 identified variants in the KMT2E gene in individuals with non-syndromic autism. O'Donnell-Luria–Rodan syndrome was first described by physician geneticists Anne O'Donnell-Luria and Lance Rodan at Boston Children's Hospital/Harvard Medical School in 2019. As of 2025, around 120 individuals have been diagnosed with the condition.
