= Fetal valproate spectrum disorder =

- Other names: Fetal valproate syndrome (FVS), fetal valproic acid syndrome, valproic acid embryopathy
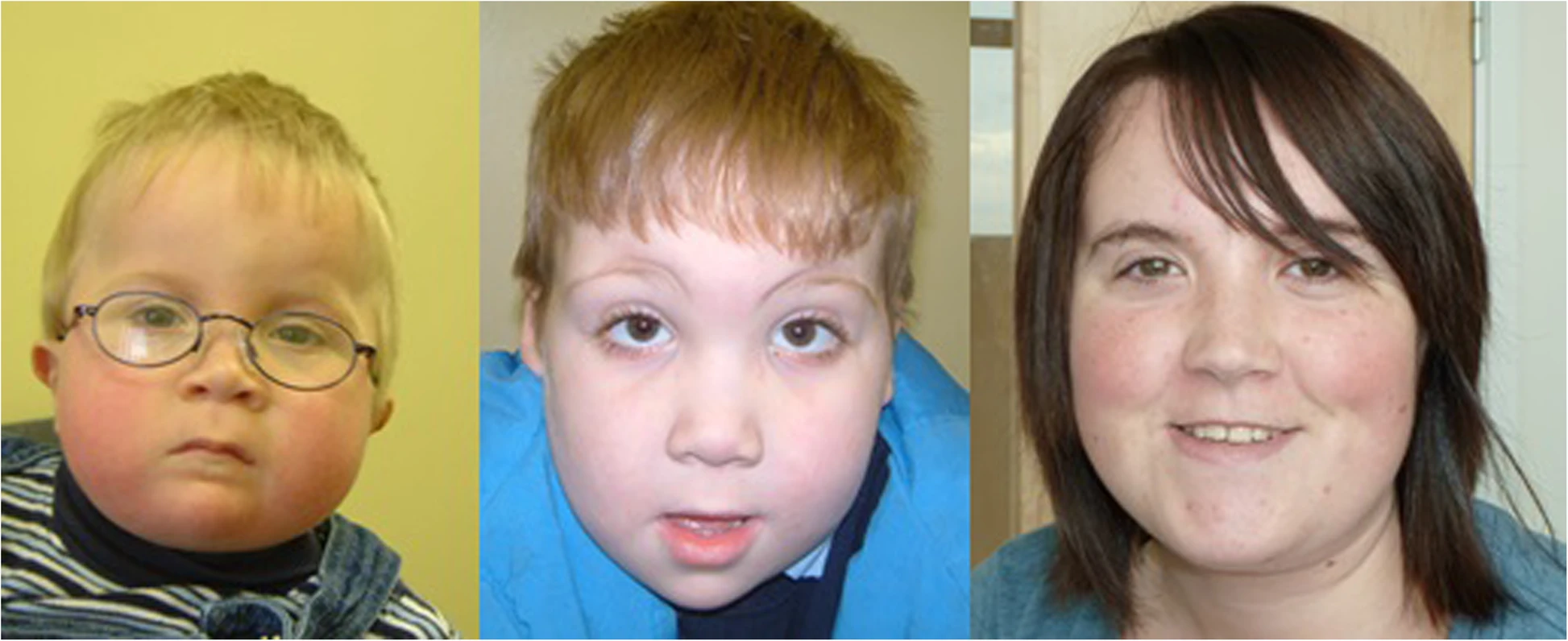
- Facial features associated with valproate exposure at different ages
- Specialty: Medical genetics, pediatrics
- Symptoms: Neural tube defects, distinctive facial features, congenital heart defects, limb abnormalities, developmental delays, autism spectrum disorder
- Complications: Intellectual disability, cognitive impairments, physical disabilities
- Usual onset: Prenatal
- Duration: Lifelong
- Causes: Prenatal exposure to valproic acid (VPA)
- Diagnostic method: Based on clinical features, history of VPA exposure, diagnostic imaging, genetic counseling
- Differential diagnosis: Other antiepileptic drug-related fetopathies, fetal alcohol spectrum disorder
- Prevention: Avoiding valproic acid during pregnancy, using alternative medications, folic acid supplementation
- Treatment: Multidisciplinary management including regular monitoring, early intervention therapies, surgical correction of anomalies, supportive therapies
- Prognosis: Variable; depends on severity and type of anomalies
- Frequency: Rare; exact prevalence unknown, fewer than 50,000 cases in the U.S.

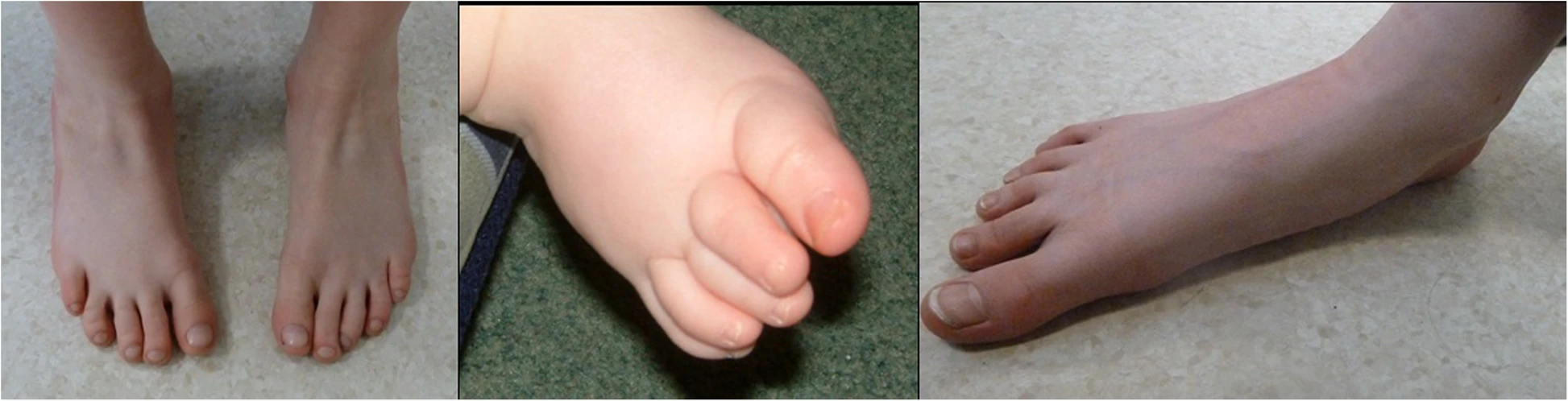
Minor limb malformations seen after valproate exposure

Fetal valproate spectrum disorder (FVSD), previously known as fetal valproate syndrome (FVS), is a rare disease caused by prenatal exposure to valproic acid (VPA), a medication commonly used to treat epilepsy, bipolar disorder, and migraines. This exposure can lead to a range of neurodevelopmental and physical symptoms, including cognitive impairments, developmental delays, autism spectrum disorder (ASD), attention deficit hyperactivity disorder (ADHD), and congenital malformations.

== Overview ==
Valproate causes birth defects; exposure during pregnancy is associated with about three times as many major abnormalities as usual, mainly spina bifida with the risks being related to the strength of medication used and use of more than one drug. "Fetal Valproate Syndrome" (FVS) has been used to refer to the effects of valproate exposure in utero. However, similar to the discussion about the adverse effect of exposure to alcohol in utero ("fetal alcohol spectrum disorder"), a 2019 study proposed the term "Fetal valproate spectrum disorder" (FVSD) because valproate exposure can lead to a wide range of possible presentations, which can be influenced by various factors (including dosage and timing of exposure). The dysmorphic features associated with VPA exposure can be subtle and age-dependent, making it challenging to designate individuals as having the characteristic dysmorphism or not, especially for those with limited expertise in the area. While the presence of typical facial dysmorphism is suggestive of the condition, it is not required for diagnosis. This change in terminology to FVSD would benefit individuals affected by the neurodevelopmental effects of VPA exposure without significant malformations, since they can experience impairments in their everyday functioning similar to those with classical FVS. Characteristics of valproate syndrome may include facial features that tend to evolve with age, including a triangle-shaped forehead, tall forehead with bifrontal narrowing, epicanthic folds, medial deficiency of eyebrows, flat nasal bridge, broad nasal root, anteverted nares, shallow philtrum, long upper lip and thin vermillion borders, thick lower lip and small downturned mouth. While developmental delay is usually associated with altered physical characteristics (dysmorphic features), this is not always the case.

Children of mothers taking valproate during pregnancy are at risk for lower IQs. Maternal valproate use during pregnancy increased the probability of autism in the offspring compared to mothers not taking valproate from 1.5% to 4.4%. A 2005 study found rates of autism among children exposed to sodium valproate before birth in the cohort studied were 8.9%. The normal incidence for autism in the general population in 2018 was estimated at 1 in 44 (2.3%). An updated March 2023 report estimates the number increased to 1 in 36 in 2020 (approximately 4% of boys and 1% of girls). A 2009 study found that the 3-year-old children of pregnant women taking valproate had an IQ nine points lower than that of a well-matched control group. However, further research in older children and adults is needed.

Sodium valproate has been associated with paroxysmal tonic upgaze of childhood, also known as Ouvrier–Billson syndrome, from childhood or fetal exposure. This condition resolved after discontinuing valproate therapy.

Women who intend to become pregnant should switch to a different medication if possible or decrease their dose of valproate. Women who become pregnant while taking valproate should be warned that it causes birth defects and cognitive impairment in the newborn, especially at high doses (although valproate is sometimes the only drug that can control seizures, and seizures in pregnancy could have worse outcomes for the fetus than exposure to valproate). Studies have shown that taking folic acid supplements can reduce the risk of congenital neural tube defects. The use of valproate for migraine or bipolar disorder during pregnancy is contraindicated in the European Union, Australia, New Zealand, the UK and the United States, and the medicines are not recommended for epilepsy during pregnancy unless there is no other effective treatment available.

== Paternal exposure ==
A 2023 retrospective study of Norway, Denmark, and Sweden found a significantly increased risk of neurodevelopmental disabilities in the children of fathers exposed to valproate up to 3 months prior to conception, compared to offspring paternally exposed to lamotrigine/levetiracetam. This led the EMA to recommend "the need to consider effective contraception, while using valproate and for at least 3 months after treatment discontinuation. Male patients should not donate sperm during treatment and for at least 3 months after treatment discontinuation."

== See also ==
- Syndromic autism
- Fetal alcohol spectrum disorder
