= International SCN2A Awareness Day =

Health awareness day

SCN2A Awareness Day
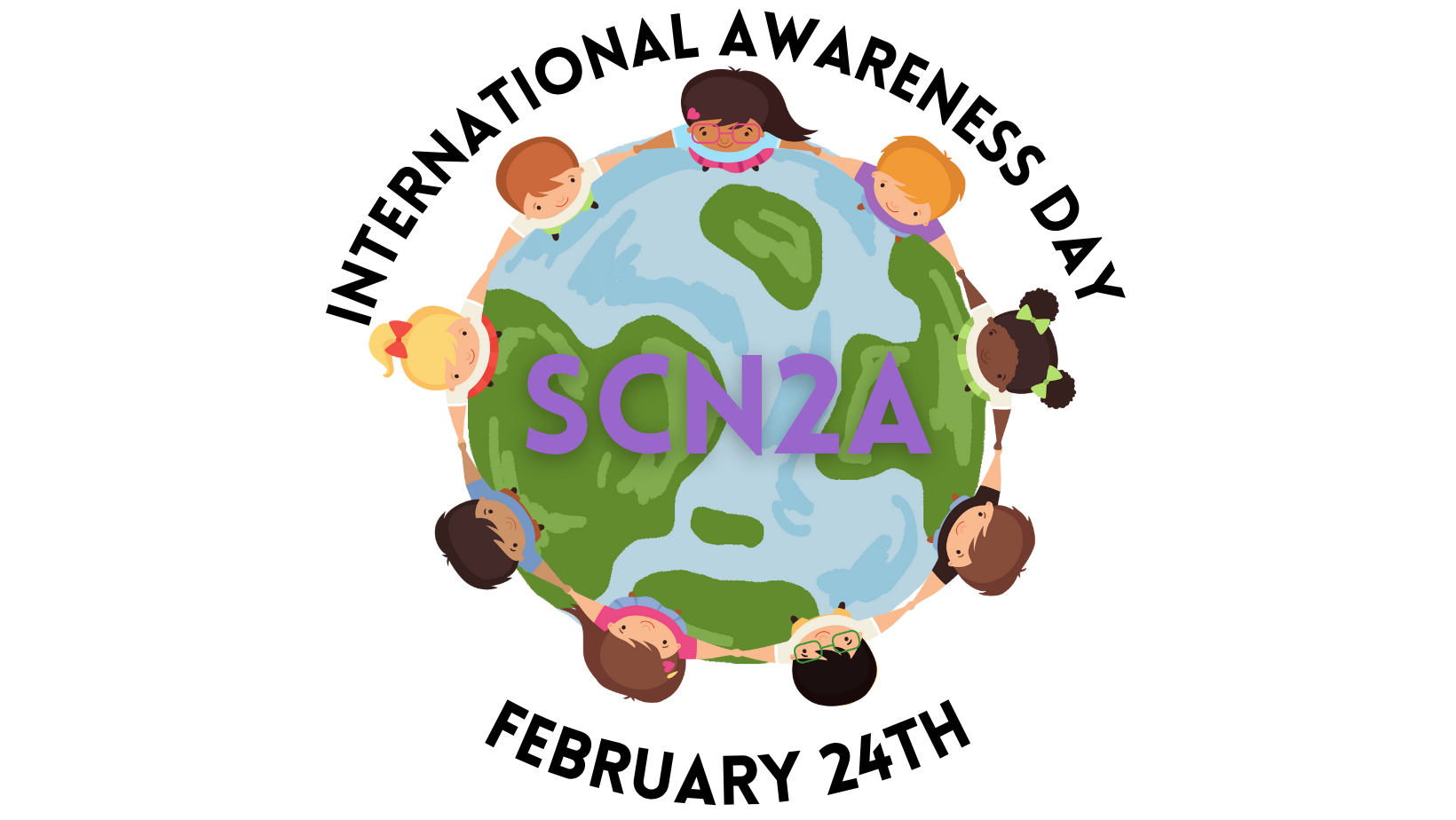
- Observed by: International
- Liturgical color: Blue (autism), Green (movement disorders), and Purple (epilepsy)
- Type: International
- Significance: Raise awareness; fund research and community support; promote need for early genetic testing
- Date: February 24
- Frequency: Annual
- First time: 2017
- Started by: FamilieSCN2A Foundation
- Related to: SCN2A, Epilepsy, Autism, Developmental epileptic encephalopathies (DEEs)

International SCN2A Awareness Day is globally recognized as February 24 each year. The goal is to raise awareness of disorders caused by pathological variants in the SCN2A gene, including epilepsy, autism, intellectual disability, and self-limited familial infantile epilepsy (SelFIE). Collectively, these are called SCN2A-Related Disorders. Advocacy goals for SCN2A Awareness Day include improving care, funding research and community support efforts, and promoting early genetic testing and counseling.

== Formation and history ==
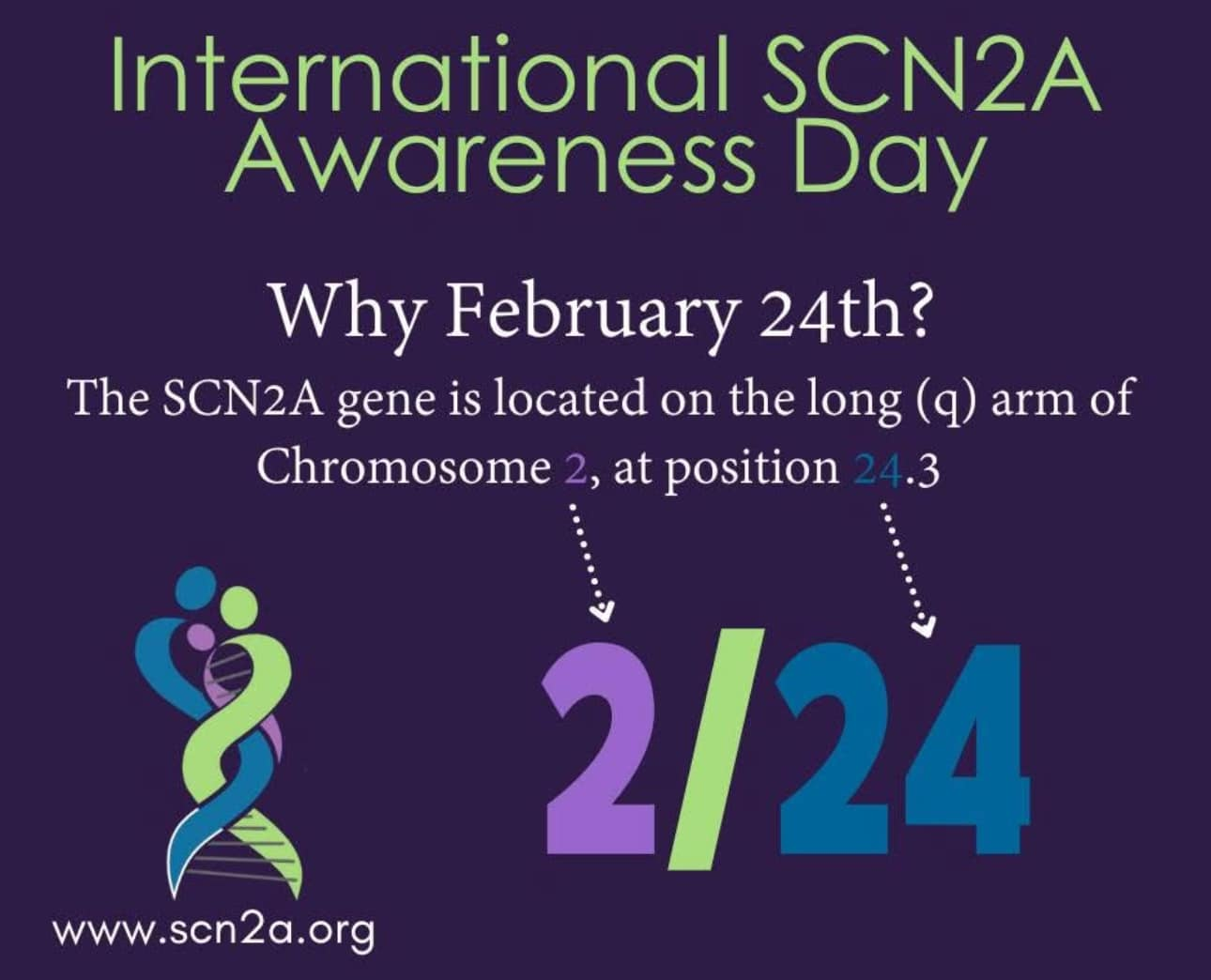

International SCN2A Awareness Day is celebrated each year on February 24. The date was chosen in 2017 due to SCN2A's location on the long (q) arm of chromosome 2 at position 24.3.

Rare disease awareness days are popular activities for patient advocacy foundations, often as a first step before expanding into larger legislative or regulatory engagements. FamilieSCN2A Foundation, SCN2A Australia, SCN2A Brasil, SCN2A Georgia, SCN2A Europe, SCN2A Foundation, SCN2A Germany e.V., SCN2A Italia, SCN2A UK, and SCN2A Ukraine work together for collaborative advocacy day activities.

February 24 was first mentioned on social media in 2016 by the FamilieSCN2A Foundation, in preparation for the first official observance on February 24, 2017.

Clinicians, researchers, and other professionals also help to spread awareness. One of the first professional statements was in 2021 from a Q&A with epilepsy expert M. Scott Perry from Cook Children's health system in Fort Worth, Texas.

== Description ==
SCN2A patient advocacy organizations from around the globe promote International SCN2A Awareness Day each year on February 24. The most common activities involve social media campaigns to share educational information and personal stories of people affected by SCN2A-related disorders.Grassroots efforts include encouraging individual families to share their stories publicly or within their social circles, participating in community events, and sharing information with medical and educational providers.

=== Awareness colors and attire ===
Participants are encouraged to wear SCN2A awareness clothing or accessories, often colored blue (autism), green (movement disorders), and purple (epilepsy) to represent established awareness colors of some of the phenotypic manifestations of SCN2A-related disorders.

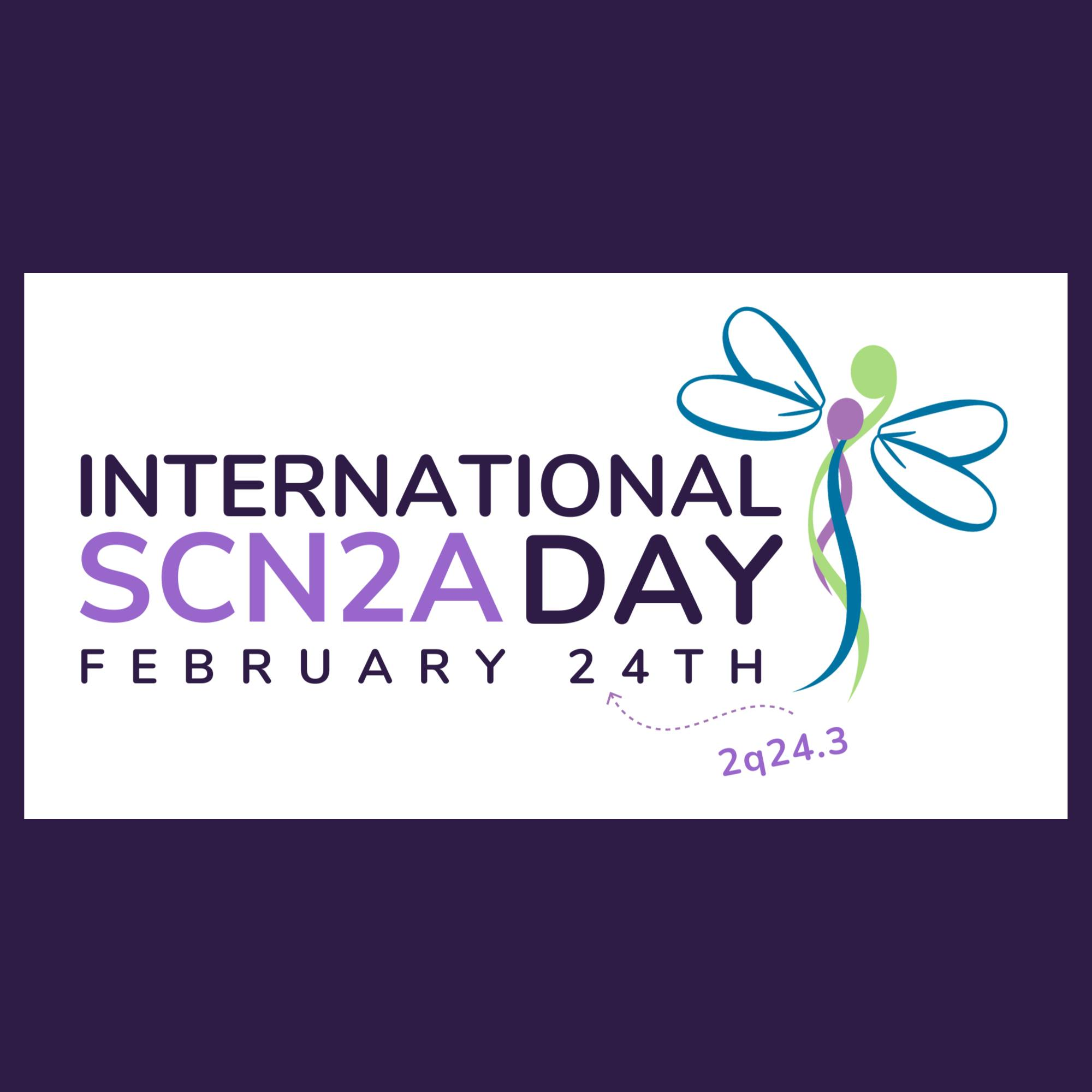
International SCN2A Awareness Day February 24

=== Countdown ===
The 2025 International SCN2A Awareness Day activities included a countdown to February 24 by spotlighting children from around the world. Representation from Algeria, Australia, Belgium, Brazil, Colombia, France, Georgia, India, Israel, Italy, Lebanon, Lithuania, Luxembourg, Malaysia, New Caledonia, Northern Ireland, Poland, Romania, Spain, Switzerland, Turkey, United Kingdom, Ukraine, and the United States highlighted the global nature of this rare disorder.

=== SCN2A fact of the day ===
In 2025, a multi-foundation educational and awareness campaign included sharing the SCN2A Fact of the Day for each day in February leading up to February 24. Topics for Fact of the Day include information on incidence, prevalence, history, demographics, scientific facts, and clinical presentation of SCN2A-related disorders.

=== Related awareness days ===
SCN2A-related disorders have widely varying phenotypes, with some affected individuals experiencing epilepsy, autism/intellectual disability, movement disorders, and other co-morbidities. Members of the SCN2A community may participate in other related awareness days, which vary by region. Observed days may include Seizure Action Plan Awareness Week (February 9-16), Rare Disease Day (last day of February), Purple Day for epilepsy awareness (March 26), Autism Awareness / Acceptance Month (April), International Bereaved Mother's Day (first Sunday in May), World Brain Day (July 22), International Bereaved Father's Day (last Sunday in August), Augmentative and Alternative Communication Awareness Month (October) and Epilepsy Awareness Month (November).

== United States: Proclamations and Resolutions ==
In the United States, proclamations and resolutions are formal recognitions by state governments for important issues affecting their constituents, including disease awareness days. Rare disease umbrella organizations like NORD and Global Genes encourage and support patient advocacy organizations in efforts to obtain awareness day proclamations as part of their larger advocacy efforts. While the processes for each state vary, many only allow constituents to submit the request. In some states like Tennessee, requests for resolutions are sponsored by legislators. In others, like Virginia, a request for a proclamation is made directly through the governor's office.

With the help of resident families in each state, the FamilieSCN2A Foundation helped secure proclamations and/or resolutions in 13 out of 50 US States. The first three states to recognize SCN2A Awareness Day were California, Massachusetts, and Pennsylvania. By February 24, 2025, Arkansas, Georgia, Illinois, Louisiana, Maine, Maryland, Missouri, Tennessee, Texas, and West Virginia had also formally recognized the day.

The language for state proclamations is formal and structured, typically including 4-6 "Whereas" clauses to highlight key facts. The proclamation from the State of Georgia uses standard language typically provided to the applicant by patient advocacy organizations:

WHEREAS: SCN2A-related disorders are a leading single gene cause of childhood epilepsy, intellectual disability, and autism spectrum disorder; and

WHEREAS: In addition to seizures and autism, SCN2A-related disorders are also associated with a spectrum of symptoms ranging from severe, life threatening conditions to developmental delays. These include sleep disturbances, GI dysfunction, movement disorders, pain and dysautonomia; and

WHEREAS: SCN2A is a powerful research model that can lead to discoveries that treat ALL children with autism spectrum disorder; and

WHEREAS: SCN2A-related disorders frequently go undetected due to the lack of awareness about the syndrome, even within the medical community, due to the rarity of the disorder; and

WHEREAS: The State of Georgia is leading the way for SCN2A research, including the discovery of how the dysfunction of SCN2A results in autism spectrum disorder; now

I, BRIAN P. KEMP, Governor of the State of Georgia, do hereby proclaim February 24th, 2024, as SCN2A AWARENESS DAY in Georgia.
