= KMT2E =

Protein-coding gene in humans

Identifiers
- Aliases: KMT2E, HDCMC04P, MLL5, NKp44L, lysine methyltransferase 2E, ODLURO, lysine methyltransferase 2E (inactive), SETD5B
- External IDs: OMIM: 608444; MGI: 1924825; GeneCards: KMT2E
Available structures
PDB	Ortholog search: PDBe RCSB
PDB	List of PDB id codes 2LV9, 4L58

Gene location (Human)
Chr.	Chromosome 7 (human)
Band	7q22.3	Start	104,940,943 bp
Band	7q22.3	End	105,115,019 bp

Gene location (Mouse)
Chr.	Chromosome 5 (mouse)
Band	5|5 A3	Start	23,639,439 bp
Band	5|5 A3	End	23,709,233 bp
RNA expression pattern
Bgee	Human / Mouse (ortholog); Top expressed in: tendon of biceps brachii; mucosa of paranasal sinus; Achilles tendon; sperm; internal globus pallidus; pylorus; buccal mucosa cell; visceral pleura; corpus callosum; epithelium of colon / Top expressed in: Rostral migratory stream; genital tubercle; cumulus cell; parotid gland; conjunctival fornix; tail of embryo; human fetus; ascending aorta; pineal gland; blood; More reference expression data
BioGPS	n/a
Gene ontology
Molecular function	metal ion binding; protein binding; histone-lysine N-methyltransferase activity; enzyme binding; methylated histone binding
Cellular component	cytoplasm; nuclear speck; membrane; plasma membrane; chromatin; nucleus; nucleoplasm; chromosome; microtubule organizing center; cytoskeleton; protein-containing complex
Biological process	neutrophil activation; regulation of transcription, DNA-templated; transcription, DNA-templated; DNA methylation; erythrocyte differentiation; cell cycle; neutrophil mediated immunity; histone lysine methylation; regulation of megakaryocyte differentiation; positive regulation of transcription, DNA-templated; positive regulation of G1/S transition of mitotic cell cycle; positive regulation of histone H3-K4 trimethylation; chromatin organization
Sources:Amigo / QuickGO
Orthologs
Databases	NCBI: entry; OMA: entry
Species	Human	Mouse
Entrez	55904	69188
Ensembl	ENSG00000005483	ENSMUSG00000029004
UniProt	Q8IZD2	Q3UG20
RefSeq (mRNA)	NM_018682; NM_032187; NM_182931	NM_026984
RefSeq (protein)	NP_061152; NP_891847	NP_081260
Location (UCSC)	Chr 7: 104.94 – 105.12 Mb	Chr 5: 23.64 – 23.71 Mb
PubMed search
- Wikidata
View/Edit Human	View/Edit Mouse

Histone-lysine N-methyltransferase 2E, also known as myeloid/lymphoid or mixed-lineage leukemia 5 (MLL5), is a protein that in humans is encoded by the KMT2E gene.

== Function ==
This gene is a member of the myeloid/lymphoid or mixed-lineage leukemia (MLL) family and encodes a protein with an N-terminal PHD zinc finger and a central SET domain. Overexpression of the protein inhibits cell cycle progression. Alternate transcriptional splice variants have been characterized.

== Clinical importance ==
Mutations in this gene can cause O'Donnell-Luria–Rodan syndrome, a condition associated with intellectual disability, autism, macrocephaly, hypotonia, functional gastrointestinal abnormalities and epilepsy.
