= Cohen syndrome =

- Other names: Pepper syndrome, Cervenka syndrome
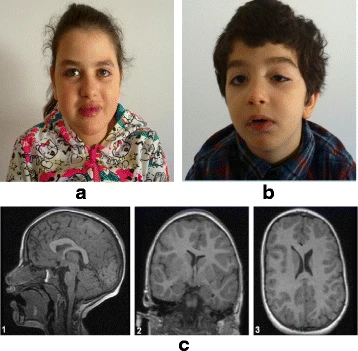
- In this illustration, 2 patients with Cohen syndrome and patient's (Fig1.A) brain MRI are shown. Patient A has prominent lips and short philtrum, thick hair eyebrows, and lashes; also, Fig.1C shows the lateral ventricular asymmetry and thick corpus callosum. Patient B has thick hair eyebrows and lashes, micrognathia, downslanted palpebral fissures.

Cohen syndrome (also known as Pepper syndrome or Cervenka syndrome) is a very rare autosomal recessive genetic disorder with varied expression, characterised by obesity, intellectual disability, distinct craniofacial abnormalities and potential ocular dysfunction.

== Signs and symptoms ==
Patients with Cohen syndrome very frequently exhibit abnormal eyelash and eyelid morphology, teeth abnormalities, lingual aplasia or hypoplasia, arachnodactyly, chorioretinal dystrophy, downslanted palpebral fissures, gingival overgrowth, global developmental delay, a high and narrow palate, maxillary hypoplasia, zygomatic bone hypoplasia, hypotonia, intellectual disability, long eyelashes, low anterior hairline, microcephaly, micrognathia, myopia, neurological speech impairment, neutropenia, open mouth, prominent nasal bridge, sandal gap, short philtrum, slender toes, tapered fingers, and thick eyebrows.

Some other frequently observed symptoms include abnormal skin pigmentation, cat cry, clinodactyly, cubitus valgus, decreased fetal movement, delayed puberty, failure to thrive during infancy, feeding difficulties during infancy, syndactyly, genu valgum, intrauterine growth retardation, joint hyperflexibility, macrodontia, narrow palm, obesity, short stature, thick hair, and a weak cry.

== Genetics ==
This syndrome is caused by pathogenic variants (mutations) in the VPS13B gene at chromosomal locus 8q22. It has an autosomal recessive transmission with variable expression. Variants in VSP13B also cause Mirhosseini–Holmes–Walton syndrome, which is now considered to be the same entity as Cohen syndrome

== Diagnosis ==
Cohen syndrome is diagnosed by clinical examination but is often difficult due to variation in expression. Ocular complications, though rare, are listed as optic atrophy, microphthalmia, pigmentary chorioretinitis, hemeralopia (decreased vision in bright light), myopia, strabismus, nystagmus and iris/retinal coloboma.

General appearance is obesity with thin/elongated arms and legs. Micrognathia, short philtrum and high vaulted palate are common. Variable intellectual disability with occasional seizure and deafness also is characteristic of Cohen syndrome.

== Management ==
Some of the symptoms of Cohen syndrome can be addressed through early intervention with medical specialists. Those who have this disease may benefit from early exposure to speech, physical, and occupational therapy to correct symptoms such as joint overflexibility, developmental delays, hypotonia, and motor clumsiness. Diagnosis may potentially be delayed due to the lack of a definitive molecular test as well as the clinical variability of published case reports.

Glasses are beneficial to those who have severe nearsightedness, whereas individuals with retinal degeneration need training for the visually impaired, which is usually more beneficial when this is addressed at a young age. Younger patients start out having unimpaired vision, but it starts to deteriorate at a young age and does so slowly. If vision is able to improve with the use of glasses, they should be worn to help facilitate concept development. Retinal degeneration cannot be ameliorated with glasses.

The type of therapy needed for each individual varies, as not every affected individual would benefit from speech, physical, and occupational therapies. The type of therapy for each person is highly individualized. Individuals who have Cohen syndrome may also benefit from psychosocial support.

Many people who have Cohen syndrome also have neutropenia which is a condition in which an individual has an abnormally low number of white blood cells called neutrophils. Having this condition may make these individuals susceptible to infections. Granulocyte-colony stimulating factor (G-CSF) is one possible treatment for neutropenia.

Monitoring weight gain and growth is crucial, as well as annual ophthalmologic and hematologic evaluations and checkups. While there are treatments available to people with Cohen syndrome, there are no known cures for the disease.

== Prevalence ==
Over the past several years, there have been approximately 50 new cases worldwide. There are population groups with this condition in Australia, New Zealand, the UK and the US. It still seems to go undiagnosed, leaving the number of known cases less than 500.

== Etymology ==
The syndrome is named after Michael Cohen, William Pepper and Jaroslav Cervenka, who researched the illness.

== See also ==
- List of syndromes
- Characteristics of syndromic ASD conditions
