= Calciumopathy =

Disease category

A calciumopathy is a disease caused by disruption to the use of calcium within a cell. To a large extent, a calciumopathy is a type of channelopathy, or a disease caused by disturbed function of ion channel subunits or the proteins that regulate them; calciumopathies also include dysfunctions of regulatory pathways and mitochondria. Many calciumopathies are complex polygenic diseases; clues to their understanding are coming from the rarer monogenic forms of common symptoms such as seizures, ataxia, and migraine.
