= MECP2 duplication syndrome =

- Other names: X-linked intellectual disability-hypotonia-recurrent Infections syndrome
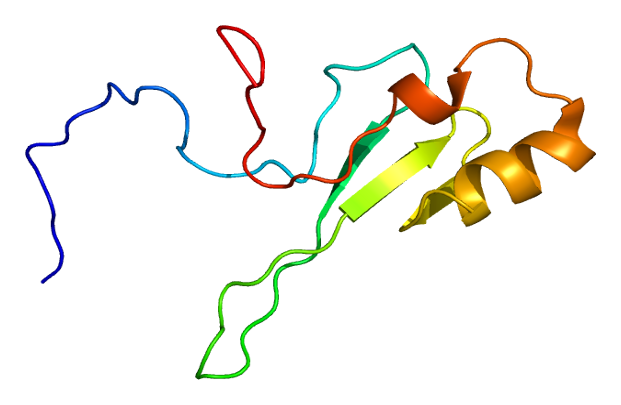
- This condition is due to MECP2 overexpression
- Specialty: Medical genetics

MECP2 duplication syndrome (M2DS) is a rare disease that is characterized by severe intellectual disability and impaired motor function. It is an X-linked genetic disorder caused by the overexpression of the MECP2 gene.

== Signs and symptoms ==
Symptoms of M2DS include infantile hypotonia and failure to thrive, delayed psychomotor development, impaired speech, abnormal or absent gait, epilepsy, spasticity, gastrointestinal motility problems, recurrent infections, and genitourinary abnormalities. Many of those affected by M2DS also fit diagnostic criteria for autism. M2DS can be associated with syndromic facies, namely an abnormally flat back of the head, underdevelopment of the midface, ear anomalies, deep-set eyes, prominent chin, pointed nose, and a flat nasal bridge.

== Cause ==
M2DS is one of the several types of X-linked intellectual disability. The cause of M2DS is a duplication of the MECP2 or Methyl CpG binding protein 2 gene located on the X chromosome (Xq28). The MeCP2 protein plays a pivotal role in regulating brain function. Increased levels of MECP2 protein results in abnormal neural function and impaired immune system. Mutations in the MECP2 gene are also commonly associated with Rett syndrome in females. Advances in genetic testing and more widespread use of array comparative genomic hybridization has led to increased diagnosis of MECP2 duplication syndrome. It is thought to represent ~1% of X-linked male mental disability cases. Females affected by this condition often do not show symptoms.

== Diagnosis ==
Diagnosis is made based on genetic testing.

== Management ==
Treatment is supportive and based on symptoms.

== Epidemiology ==
The syndrome primarily affects young males. Preliminary studies suggest that prevalence may be 1.8 per 10,000 live male births. 50% of those affected do not live beyond 25 years of age, with deaths attributed to the impaired immune function.

== History ==
M2DS was first described in 1999.

In a Nature article published on November 25, 2015, it was revealed that researchers at the Baylor College of Medicine, led by Huda Y. Zoghbi, have reversed MECP2 Duplication Syndrome in adult symptomatic mice using antisense therapy. Mice treated with an experimental ASO administered through the central nervous system had a reduction of MECP2 protein to normal levels and symptoms of hypoactivity, anxiety, and abnormal social behavior were resolved. Additionally, the seizure activity of the mice and abnormal EEG discharges were abolished. Initial studies demonstrated that reducing the MECP2 protein levels to the correct amount also normalized the expression of the other genes controlled by the MECP2 protein.

== See also ==
- Characteristics of syndromic ASD conditions
- List of syndromes
- Sequence (medicine)
- Symptom
- Toxidrome
