= VPS13B =

Protein-coding gene in the species Homo sapiens

Identifiers
- Aliases: VPS13B, CHS1, COH1, vacuolar protein sorting 13 homolog B
- External IDs: OMIM: 607817; MGI: 1916380; GeneCards: VPS13B

Gene location (Human)
| Chr. | Chromosome 8 (human) |
| Band | 8q22.2 | Start | 99,013,266 bp |
| Band | 8q22.2 | End | 99,877,580 bp |

Gene location (Mouse)
| Chr. | Chromosome 15 (mouse) |
| Band | 15|15 B3.1 | Start | 35,371,306 bp |
| Band | 15|15 B3.1 | End | 35,931,375 bp |
RNA expression pattern
| Bgee | Human / Mouse (ortholog); Top expressed in: sural nerve; nipple; bronchial epithelial cell; pylorus; cardia; buccal mucosa cell; secondary oocyte; epithelium of colon; lactiferous duct; synovial joint / Top expressed in: Paneth cell; otolith organ; utricle; hand; substantia nigra; spermatid; lumbar subsegment of spinal cord; dorsal striatum; Epithelium of choroid plexus; pituitary gland; More reference expression data |
| BioGPS | n/a |
Orthologs
| Databases | NCBI: entry; OMA: entry |
| Species | Human | Mouse |
| Entrez | 157680 | 666173 |
| Ensembl | ENSG00000132549 | ENSMUSG00000037646 |
| UniProt | Q7Z7G8 | Q80TY5 |
| RefSeq (mRNA) | NM_015243; NM_017890; NM_152564; NM_181661; NM_184042 | NM_177151 |
| RefSeq (protein) | NP_056058; NP_060360; NP_689777; NP_858047 | NP_796125 |
| Location (UCSC) | Chr 8: 99.01 – 99.88 Mb | Chr 15: 35.37 – 35.93 Mb |
| PubMed search |
- Wikidata
| View/Edit Human | View/Edit Mouse |

Intermembrane lipid transfer protein VPS13B, also known as vacuolar protein sorting-associated 13B, and Cohen syndrome protein 1 is a protein that in humans is encoded by the VPS13B gene (previously CHS1). It is a giant protein associated with the Golgi apparatus that is believed to be involved in post-Golgi apparatus sorting and trafficking. Mutations in the human VPS13B gene cause Cohen syndrome.

VPS13B gene is also referred to as CHS1, COH1, KIAA0532, and DKFZp313I0811.

The cytogenetic location of the human VPS13B gene is 8q22, which is the long arm of chromosome eight at position 22.2. Various splice variants encoding isoforms have been identified. The canonical form of the expressed protein encoded by the human VPS13B gene has 3997 amino acids.

== Gene ==
The VPS13B gene is located on chromosome 8q22. Deletions in this chromosome are associated with Cohen syndrome, which is why this gene is alternatively called COH1. The gene is made up of 66 exons, four of which are alternative. The pattern of alternative splicing in the VS13B gene is complex in the analyzed regions including exons 28B and 28. This eventually causes four termination codons and three alternatively spliced forms to be in use. Exon 2 is where its translation start codon occurs. VPS13B is a large gene: it spans a genomic DNA sequence region of about 864 kilobase pairs, or 846,000 base pairs. The VPS13B gene is widely expressed, especially in the prostate, testis, ovary, and colon with transcripts of about 12 to 14 kilobase pairs. It is also expressed in the fetal brain, liver, and kidney, with transcripts of about 2.0 to 5.0 kilobase pairs. Expression in the adult brain is very minimal. Variants 1A and 2A are the principal variants of the gene that encode 4,022 and 39,997 amino acid proteins, respectively. Two Alu repeat sequences are present in the 3' untranslated regions.

== Nomenclature ==
The VPS13B gene is also known as:

- CHS1
- COH1
- Cohen syndrome 1
- DKFZp313I0811
- KIAA0532
- vacuolar protein sorting 13 homolog B (yeast)
- vacuolar protein sorting 13B
- VP13B_HUMAN

== Function ==
Proteins produced from the VPS13B gene are part of the Golgi apparatus. They are also responsible for sorting and transporting of proteins inside of the cell. The VPS13B protein is important because it plays an important role in the function of normal growth, the development of neurons, and the development of adipocytes. This protein may also play a role in the development of the function for eyes, the hematological system, and the central nervous system; and in the storage and distribution of fats in the body. VPS13B is found at locus 8q22.2. This means that the VPS13B gene is located on chromosome 8 at position 22.2 on the long q arm at 8q22.2. The VPS13B protein is composed of 4,022 amino acids and might have a total of ten trans-membrane domains and a complex pattern of functional motifs.

Presently, the VPS13B gene is recognized as a protein-coding gene that produces the VPS13B protein. The VPS13B protein has been associated with the Golgi apparatus and intracellular processes such as protein modification, protein organization, and protein distribution. It has also been speculated that the VPS13B protein may influence the development of certain somatic cells and body systems, and may be involved in the storing and allocation of fats in humans.

Mutations in the VPS13B gene can result in the abnormal function of the VPS13B protein. Mutations within the gene have been linked as a potential factor in Cohen syndrome and autism. In Cohen syndrome, it is thought that deletion mutations in the gene alter the shape of the VPS13B protein, resulting in a shorter, nonfunctioning protein. Altered VPS13B protein is then unable to function properly due to these genetic changes, thus resulting in an obstruction of regular processes. Studies have also linked mutations in the VPS13B gene to osteoporosis. An association between an increase of the VPS13B copy number variants and a lower bone mineral density in adults has been found. Still, the normal, definitive function of the VPS13B gene is unknown, as are the specific implications of its mutated forms.

== Clinical significance ==
Over 150 types of different mutations in the VPS13B gene have been identified in individuals diagnosed with Cohen syndrome. A deletion in the VPS13B gene causes a premature stop signal in the instructions for making the VPS13B protein, causing the protein to become abnormally short and nonfunctional. When this happens, the nonfunctional protein causes the Golgi apparatus not to work properly and stops normal glycosylation.

=== Cohen syndrome ===
COH1 depletion in HeLa cells by RNA interference disrupts normal Golgi organization. Deletions in this gene is a cause of autosomal recessive Cohen syndrome. Fibroblasts from Cohen syndrome patients also have abnormal Golgi. Cohen syndrome patients have been shown to have defective protein glycosylation, which is a major function of the Golgi, thus supporting the suggestion that Golgi dysfunction contributes to Cohen syndrome pathology.

Cohen syndrome is a very rare inherited genetic condition which has been diagnosed in almost one thousand people worldwide. It occurs when there is a biallelic mutation in the VPS13B gene. This disorder causes a variety of symptoms that never ease. Microcephaly, hypotonia, worsening eyesight, retinal dystrophy, delayed puberty, hyper mobility, and obesity are just a few examples. People with this syndrome have distinct facial features. They have bulging noses, unusually shaped eyes, thick hair, narrow hands and feet, and long, thin fingers.

The symptoms of Cohen syndrome begin to show at a very young age. At birth, newborns may show no symptoms at all, but once they start to develop their facial characteristics, it will be noticeable. It begins with failure to thrive in infants and children, and then the developmental delays start to show: microcephaly, retinochorodial dystrophy, psychomotor retardation, high myopia, neutropenia, joint hyper mobility and the distinct facial features start forming. During the teenage and adolescent years, short stature and obesity start to become concerns. Almost 30% of people with this syndrome are non-verbal and illiterate. In many instances where speech delay is prominent in this syndrome, aphthous ulcers develop inside the mouth, causing pain. Many Cohen syndrome-affected people start to lose their eyesight by age 30. Although Cohen syndrome does not decrease life expectancy, it reduces quality of life due to the inability to speak and/or see. Patients with this syndrome are also known to suffer from seizures, narrow hands and feet, and growth hormone deficiencies.

Cohen syndrome is an autosomal recessive disorder that is characterized by mainly facial dysmorphism, microcephaly, joint laxity and intermittent neutropenia. Cohen syndrome is inherited in an autosomal recessive manner, which means there is a 50% chance of being a carrier. Children of people with this syndrome are carriers for the syndrome. 75% of individuals with Cohen syndrome in the Finnish population have a mutation in both copies of the gene. Mutations in the gene VPS13B only occur in a small number of families, outside of Finnish and Amish groups.

=== Neutropenia ===
Another disease that the VPS13B gene contributes to is neutropenia, which involves a low concentration of neutrophils, a type of white blood cell. This causes the affected person to be more susceptible to infections and disease. Although this is a genetic disease, it can also be caused by certain medications and sometimes bone marrow.

=== Sutton disease 2 ===
Sutton disease is a chronic inflammatory disease that creates painful ulcers in the mouth. These can be different size and cause different amounts of pain. The disease is more commonly called canker sores.

=== Ewing sarcoma ===
Ewing sarcoma is a cancerous tumor in the bones or soft tissues, such as cartilage or nerves. It usually presents in children, teens and young adults. Other diseases are similar to Ewing sarcoma, but this one is the only one that has the VPS13B gene.

=== Microcephaly ===
Microcephaly is a medical condition in which the head is misshapen and smaller than normal. In most cases, people with microcephaly experience seizures, development delays, and problems with movement, balance, and eating. Hearing loss and losing vision can occur.

=== Other ===
Syndromic autism is also associated with this gene, as is intellectual disability.
