= SCN2A-related disorders =

Group of neurodevelopmental disorders

SCN2A-related disorders are a group of rare neurodevelopmental disorders caused by pathogenic variants in the SCN2A gene, which encodes a subunit of the voltage-gated sodium channel NaV1.2. Mutations in the SCN2A gene can cause a broad spectrum of disorders collectively referred to as SCN2A-related disorders. These include cases of autism, self-limited epilepsy, early infantile developmental and epileptic encephalopathy, later onset developmental and epileptic encephalopathy, infantile spasms, SCN2A-related disorders without epilepsy, episodic ataxia, and further movement disorders.

== Clinical significance ==
Mutations in the SCN2A gene can cause a broad spectrum of disorders collectively referred to as SCN2A-related disorders. These include cases of autism, self-limited epilepsy, early infantile developmental and epileptic encephalopathy, later onset developmental and epileptic encephalopathy, infantile spasms, SCN2A-related disorders without epilepsy, episodic ataxia, and further movement disorders. Two major groups of SCN2A mutations can be distinguished based on their functional consequences and response to seizure medication: gain of function mutations, typically associated with seizure onset within the first three months of life, and loss of function mutations, in which seizures begin after the first three months or may never occur. The former group tends to benefit from treatment with sodium channel blockers, whereas in the latter, such treatment is often ineffective or may even exacerbate seizures. Notably, SCN2A is known to be the most prominent genetic risk factor for autism-spectrum-disorders.

SCN2A gene mutations have also been identified in bitemporal glucose hypometabolism, and bipolar disorder.

== February 24th - International SCN2A Awareness Day ==
International SCN2A Awareness Day is globally recognized as February 24 each year. The goal is to raise awareness of disorders caused by pathological variants in the SCN2A gene, including epilepsy, autism, intellectual disability, and self-limited familial infantile epilepsy (SelFIE). Advocacy goals for SCN2A Awareness Day include improving care, funding research and community support efforts, and promoting early genetic testing and counseling.

== ICD-10-CM Code ==
Effective October 1, 2025, the ICD-10-CM code for SCN2A-related neurodevelopmental disorder is QA0.0101.
