= KCNH1 =

Protein-coding gene in humans

Identifiers
- Aliases: KCNH1, EAG, EAG1, Kv10.1, h-eag, TMBTS, ZLS1, hEAG1, potassium voltage-gated channel subfamily H member 1, hEAG
- External IDs: OMIM: 603305; MGI: 1341721; GeneCards: KCNH1
Available structures
PDB	Ortholog search: PDBe RCSB
PDB	List of PDB id codes 5J7E

Gene location (Human)
Chr.	Chromosome 1 (human)
Band	1q32.2	Start	210,676,823 bp
Band	1q32.2	End	211,134,165 bp

Gene location (Mouse)
Chr.	Chromosome 1 (mouse)
Band	1|1 H6	Start	191,873,082 bp
Band	1|1 H6	End	192,192,467 bp
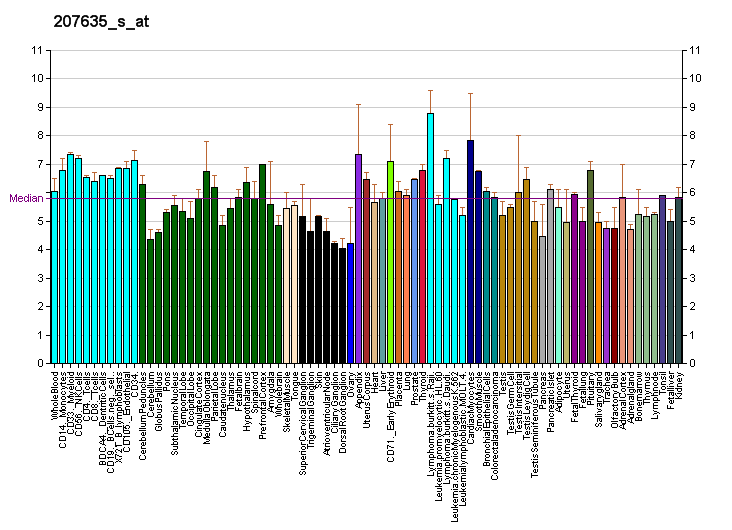
RNA expression pattern
Bgee	Human / Mouse (ortholog); Top expressed in: Brodmann area 9; prefrontal cortex; testicle; right frontal lobe; cerebellar hemisphere; right hemisphere of cerebellum; cingulate gyrus; anterior cingulate cortex; caudate nucleus; gonad / Top expressed in: secondary oocyte; epithelium of lens; olfactory tubercle; zygote; primary oocyte; primary motor cortex; nucleus accumbens; molar; lumbar spinal ganglion; superior frontal gyrus; More reference expression data
BioGPS	More reference expression data
Gene ontology
Molecular function	phosphorelay sensor kinase activity; voltage-gated potassium channel activity; calmodulin binding; cyclic nucleotide binding; ion channel activity; potassium channel activity; voltage-gated ion channel activity; protein binding; lipid binding; phosphatidylinositol bisphosphate binding; delayed rectifier potassium channel activity; identical protein binding; protein kinase binding; transmembrane transporter binding; protein heterodimerization activity; 14-3-3 protein binding
Cellular component	synapse; integral component of membrane; nucleus; axon; nuclear inner membrane; presynaptic membrane; membrane; early endosome membrane; dendrite; plasma membrane; endosome; voltage-gated potassium channel complex; postsynaptic density; cell junction; cell projection; perikaryon; intracellular membrane-bounded organelle; postsynaptic membrane; integral component of plasma membrane; cell surface; axolemma; potassium channel complex; soma; perinuclear region of cytoplasm; integral component of presynaptic membrane
Biological process	transmembrane transport; regulation of cell population proliferation; potassium ion transport; signal transduction; phosphorelay signal transduction system; regulation of ion transmembrane transport; ion transport; potassium ion transmembrane transport; myoblast fusion; regulation of membrane potential; phosphatidylinositol-mediated signaling; startle response; ion transmembrane transport; cellular response to calcium ion
Sources:Amigo / QuickGO
Orthologs
Databases	NCBI: entry; OMA: entry
Species	Human	Mouse
Entrez	3756	16510
Ensembl	ENSG00000143473	ENSMUSG00000058248
UniProt	O95259	Q60603
RefSeq (mRNA)	NM_002238; NM_172362	NM_001038607; NM_010600
RefSeq (protein)	NP_002229; NP_758872	NP_001033696; NP_034730
Location (UCSC)	Chr 1: 210.68 – 211.13 Mb	Chr 1: 191.87 – 192.19 Mb
PubMed search
- Wikidata
View/Edit Human	View/Edit Mouse

Potassium voltage-gated channel subfamily H member 1 (K_{V}10.1, EAG1) is an ion channel protein that in humans is encoded by the KCNH1 gene. Disease-causing (pathogenic) mutations in the KCNH1 gene cause KCNH1-related disorders, which can include symptoms such as mild-to-severe developmental delay, profound intellectual disability, neonatal hypotonia, myopathic facial appearance, and infantile-onset seizures. Aberrant overexpression of KCNH1 is associated with tumor progression.

== Function ==
Expression of KCNH1 is predominantly restricted to the adult central nervous system. The KCNH1 gene encodes a homotetrameric highly-conserved voltage-gated potassium channel (K_{V}10.1) thought to be responsible for reestablishing the membrane potential of excitatory neurons in response to high frequency firing.

K_{V}10.1 is a non-inactivating delayed rectifier potassium channel. Like other voltage-gated potassium ion channels, opening of the K_{V}10.1 channel pore is triggered by membrane depolarisation, which results in an outward flow of potassium ions to rectify the baseline membrane potential. K_{V}10.1 is slow to open when triggered and does not undergo an inactivation state after closing.

Structurally, K_{V}10.1 is composed of four identical subunits that are each 989 residues long (111.4 kDa). Each subunit is composed of a PAS domain, transmembrane voltage-sensing and pore domains, a C-linker, and an intracellular cyclic nucleotide-binding homology domain. Alternative splicing of this gene results in two transcript variants encoding distinct isoforms that differ by the inclusion or exclusion of 27 amino acids between the S3 and S4 helices of the voltage-sensing domain.

KCNH1 expression is activated in cilia at the onset of myoblast differentiation and known to play roles in the cell cycle and cell proliferation.

== Pathologies ==
=== KCNH1-related disorders ===
Gabbett and colleagues described Temple–Baraitser syndrome (TBS) in 2008, naming the condition after English clinical geneticists Profs Karen Temple and Michael Baraitser. TBS is categorized by intellectual disabilities, epilepsy, atypical facial features, and aplasia of the nails. It was later demonstrated that de novo missense mutations in the KCNH1 gene cause deleterious gain of function in the voltage-gated potassium channel K_{V}10.1, resulting in TBS. Patients with de novo mutations in KCNH1 were found to be affected by epilepsy (without association to TBS), while children born with germline mutations from mosaic probands were affected by TBS. This provides further evidence of the role that genetic mosaicism plays in the etiology of neurological disorders.

Type 1 Zimmermann–Laband syndrome was later found to be caused by similar missense mutations in KCNH1. This has led some researchers to believe that type 1 Zimmermann-Laband and Temple-Baraitser syndromes are different manifestations of the same disorder. Current views are that Zimmermann–Laband and Temple–Baraitser syndromes are part of the greater spectrum of KCNH1-related disorders, which encompass a continuum of severity for mild to severe developmental delay, profound intellectual disability, neonatal hypotonia, myopathic facial appearance, and infantile-onset seizures.

=== KCNH1 in cancer ===
Overexpression of KCNH1 may confer a growth advantage to cancer cells and favor tumor cell proliferation, as KCNH1 overexpression has been observed in 70% of solid tumors. Individuals with missense mutations in KCNH1 have not reported any increase in incidence of cancers.

== Interactions ==
KCNH1 has been shown to interact with KCNB1 and is inhibited by the highly-conserved secondary messenger calmodulin in the presence of calcium.

== See also ==
- Voltage-gated potassium channel
- Voltage-gated ion channel
- Channelopathy
- HERG
- KCNH1-related disorders
