= Paroxysmal tonic upgaze =

Episodes of sustained upward deviation of the eyes

Paroxysmal tonic upgaze (PTU) of childhood is a rare and distinctive neuro-ophthalmological syndrome characterized by episodes (paroxysms) of sustained upward deviation of the eyes. Symptoms normally appear in babies under one year of age and are characterized by an upward stare or gaze, with the eyes rolled back, while the chin is typically held low.

== Presentation ==
Babies suffering from PTU may exhibit normal or slightly jerky side-to-side eye movement, nausea, irritability, frequent sleep, developmental and language delays, vertigo and loss of muscle tone.

The condition is generally regarded as having a benign outcome, in the sense that it improves, rather than worsens over time. The average age of recovery is at about 2.5 years.

== Genetics ==
This condition has been associated with mutations in the following genes: CACNA1A, GRID2 and SEPSECS.

== Treatment ==
Because of the rarity of this condition there are few reports of successful treatment. Carbonic anhydrase inhibition has been reported to work in a small series.

== History ==
PTU was first described in 1988. As of 2002, approximately fifty cases had been diagnosed. Because the condition is so rare, the majority of physicians have never seen it, and thus may not recognize it. Videotaping a child both in and out of the upgaze state can be vital for reaching a diagnosis.
