= MECP2 =

DNA-binding protein involved in methylation

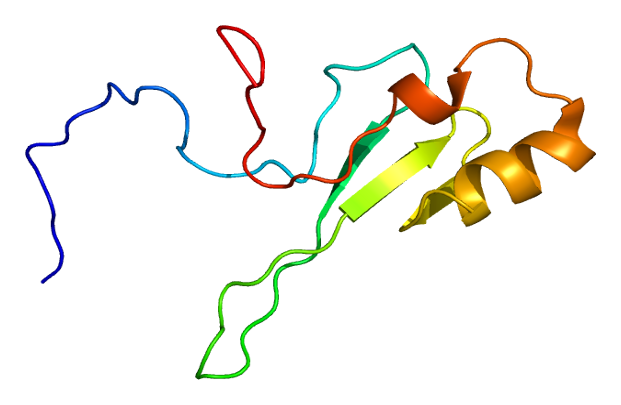

Identifiers
- Aliases: MECP2, AUTSX3, MRX16, MRX79, MRXS13, MRXSL, PPMX, RS, RTS, RTT, methyl-CpG binding protein 2
- External IDs: OMIM: 300005; MGI: 99918; GeneCards: MECP2
Available structures
PDB	Ortholog search: PDBe RCSB
PDB	List of PDB id codes 1QK9, 3C2I

Gene location (Human)
Chr.	X chromosome (human)
Band	Xq28	Start	154,021,573 bp
Band	Xq28	End	154,137,103 bp

Gene location (Mouse)
Chr.	X chromosome (mouse)
Band	X A7.3|X 37.63 cM	Start	73,070,198 bp
Band	X A7.3|X 37.63 cM	End	73,178,969 bp
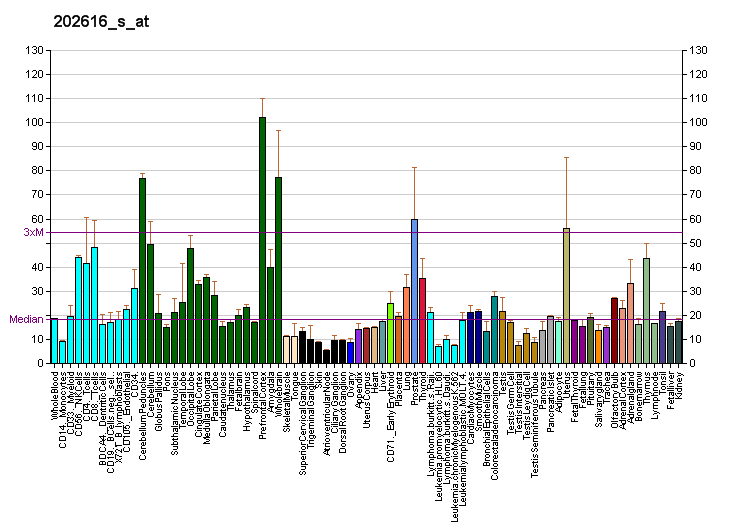

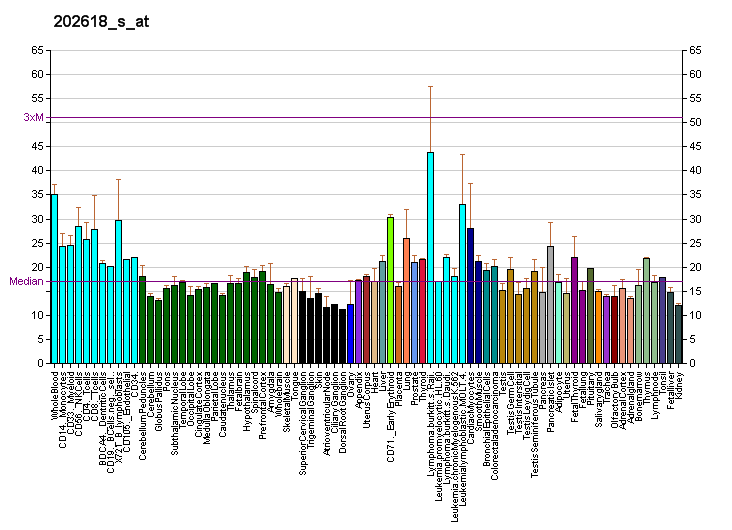

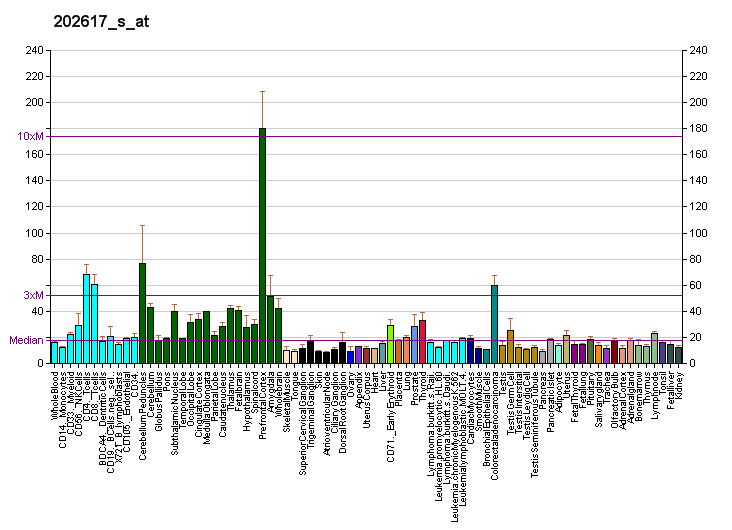
RNA expression pattern
Bgee	Human / Mouse (ortholog); Top expressed in: paraflocculus of cerebellum; Brodmann area 10; sural nerve; frontal pole; epithelium of colon; middle frontal gyrus; cerebellar vermis; Achilles tendon; postcentral gyrus; blood / Top expressed in: substantia nigra; Rostral migratory stream; pineal gland; habenula; dorsal striatum; Region I of hippocampus proper; anterior amygdaloid area; superior colliculus; ciliary body; lateral septal nucleus; More reference expression data
BioGPS	More reference expression data
Gene ontology
Molecular function	double-stranded methylated DNA binding; transcription corepressor activity; protein domain specific binding; protein N-terminus binding; DNA-binding transcription factor activity; transcription factor binding; siRNA binding; mRNA binding; chromatin binding; protein binding; DNA binding; DNA-binding transcription repressor activity, RNA polymerase II-specific; RNA binding; methyl-CpG binding
Cellular component	postsynapse; cytoplasm; mitochondrion; nucleus; heterochromatin; extracellular space; gamma-tubulin complex; centrosome; cytosol; chromatin; nucleoplasm
Biological process	negative regulation of neuron apoptotic process; multicellular organismal response to stress; inositol metabolic process; mitochondrial electron transport, ubiquinol to cytochrome c; post-embryonic development; learning; proprioception; neuron projection development; regulation of gene expression by genetic imprinting; regulation of transcription, DNA-templated; pathogenesis; neuromuscular process controlling posture; adult locomotory behavior; memory; transcription, DNA-templated; ventricular system development; neuron maturation; positive regulation of transcription, DNA-templated; glutamine metabolic process; neuromuscular process; histone acetylation; excitatory postsynaptic potential; nervous system process involved in regulation of systemic arterial blood pressure; social behavior; synapse assembly; chemical synaptic transmission; negative regulation of histone methylation; startle response; glucocorticoid metabolic process; dendrite development; negative regulation of transcription by RNA polymerase II; behavioral fear response; respiratory gaseous exchange by respiratory system; cerebellum development; regulation of synaptic plasticity; cardiolipin metabolic process; neuron differentiation; regulation of gene expression; sensory perception of pain; negative regulation of transcription, DNA-templated; phosphatidylcholine metabolic process; visual learning; protein localization; response to hypoxia; regulation of gene expression, epigenetic; cellular biogenic amine metabolic process; regulation of respiratory gaseous exchange by nervous system process; brain development; long-term memory; histone methylation; negative regulation of histone acetylation; catecholamine secretion; long-term potentiation; positive regulation of synapse assembly; negative regulation of smooth muscle cell differentiation; positive regulation of histone H3-K9 trimethylation; negative regulation of transcription from RNA polymerase II promoter involved in smooth muscle cell differentiation; mitotic spindle organization; locomotory behavior; positive regulation of cell population proliferation; response to radiation; positive regulation of G2/M transition of mitotic cell cycle; positive regulation of microtubule nucleation; transcription initiation from RNA polymerase II promoter; negative regulation of gene expression; negative regulation of angiogenesis; negative regulation of blood vessel endothelial cell migration; positive regulation of DNA methylation
Sources:Amigo / QuickGO
Orthologs
Databases	NCBI: entry; OMA: entry
Species	Human	Mouse
Entrez	4204	17257
Ensembl	ENSG00000169057	ENSMUSG00000031393
UniProt	P51608	Q9Z2D6
RefSeq (mRNA)	NM_001110792; NM_004992; NM_001316337; NM_001369391; NM_001369392 NM_001369393; NM_001369394; NM_001386137; NM_001386138; NM_001386139	NM_001081979; NM_010788
RefSeq (protein)	NP_001104262; NP_001303266; NP_004983; NP_001356320; NP_001356321 NP_001356322; NP_001356323	NP_001075448; NP_034918
Location (UCSC)	Chr X: 154.02 – 154.14 Mb	Chr X: 73.07 – 73.18 Mb
PubMed search
- Wikidata
View/Edit Human	View/Edit Mouse

MECP2 (methyl CpG binding protein 2) is a gene that encodes the protein MECP2. MECP2 appears to be essential for the normal function of nerve cells. The protein seems to be particularly important for mature nerve cells, where it is present in high levels. The MECP2 protein is likely to be involved in turning off ("repressing" or "silencing") several other genes. This prevents the genes from making proteins when they are not needed. Recent work has shown that MECP2 can also activate other genes. The MECP2 gene is located on the long (q) arm of the X chromosome in band 28 ("Xq28"), from base pair 152,808,110 to base pair 152,878,611.

MECP2 is an important reader of DNA methylation. Its methyl-CpG-binding (MBD) domain recognizes and binds 5-mC regions. MECP2 is X-linked and subject to X inactivation. MECP2 gene mutations are the cause of most cases of Rett syndrome, a progressive neurologic developmental disorder and one of the most common causes of cognitive disability in females. At least 53 disease-causing mutations in this gene have been discovered.

== Function ==
MECP2 protein is found in all cells in the body, including the brain, acting as a transcriptional repressor and activator, depending on the context. However, the idea that MECP2 functions as an activator is relatively new and remains controversial. In the brain, it is found in high concentrations in neurons and is associated with maturation of the central nervous system (CNS) and in forming synaptic contacts.

== Mechanism of action ==
The MeCP2 protein binds to forms of DNA that have been methylated. The MeCP2 protein then interacts with other proteins to form a complex that turns off the gene. MeCP2 prefers to bind to sites on the genome with a chemical alteration made to a cytosine (C) when it occurs in a particular DNA sequence, "CpG". This is a form of DNA methylation. Many genes have CpG islands, which frequently occur near the beginning of the gene. MECP2 does not bind to these islands in most cases, as they are not methylated. The expression of a few genes may be regulated through methylation of their CpG island, and MECP2 may play a role in a subset of these. Researchers have not yet determined which genes are targeted by the MeCP2 protein, but such genes are probably important for the normal function of the central nervous system. However, the first large-scale mapping of MECP2 binding sites in neurons found that only 6% of the binding sites are in CpG islands, and that 63% of MECP2-bound promoters are actively expressed and only 6% are highly methylated, indicating that MECP2's main function is something other than silencing methylated promoters.

Once bound, MeCP2 will condense the chromatin structure, form a complex with histone deacetylases (HDAC), or block transcription factors directly. More recent studies have demonstrated that MeCP2 may also function as a transcriptional activator, through recruiting the transcription factor CREB1. This was an unexpected finding which suggests that MeCP2 is a key transcriptional regulator with potentially dual roles in gene expression. In fact, the majority of genes that are regulated by MeCP2 appear to be activated rather than repressed. However, it remains controversial whether MeCP2 regulates these genes directly or whether these changes are secondary in nature. Further studies have shown MeCP2 may be able to bind directly to un-methylated DNA in some instances. MeCP2 has been implicated in regulation of imprinted genes and loci that include UBE3A and DLX5.

Reduced expression of MECP2 in Mecp2+/- neural stem cells causes an increase in senescence, impairment of proliferative capacity and accumulation of unrepaired DNA damage. After treatment of Mecp2+/- cells with any of three different DNA damaging agents, the cells accumulated more damaged DNA and were more prone to cell death than control cells. It was concluded that reduced MECP2 expression causes reduced capacity to repair DNA and this likely contributes to neurological decline.

== Structure ==
MECP2 is part of a family of methyl-CpG-binding domain proteins (MBD), but possesses its own unique differences which help set it apart from the group. It has two functional domains:

- a methyl-cytosine-binding domain (MBD) composed of 85 amino acids; and
- a transcriptional repression domain (TRD) composed of 104 amino acids

The MBD domain forms a wedge and attaches to the methylated CpG sites on the DNA strands. The TRD region then reacts with SIN3A to recruit histone deacetylases (HDAC). There are also unusual, repetitive sequences found at the carboxyl terminus. This region is closely related to the fork head family, at the amino acid level.

== Role in disease ==
The role of MECP2 in disease is primarily associated with either a loss of function (under expression) of the MECP2 gene as in Rett syndrome or in a gain of function (over expression) as in MECP2 duplication syndrome. Many mutations have been associated with loss of expression of the MECP2 gene and have been identified in Rett syndrome patients. These mutations include changes in single DNA base pairs (SNP), insertions or deletions of DNA in the MECP2 gene, and changes that affect how the gene information is processed into a protein (RNA splicing). Mutations in the gene alter the structure of the MeCP2 protein or lead to reduced amounts of the protein. As a result, the protein is unable to bind to DNA or turn other genes on or off. Genes that are normally repressed by MeCP2 remain active when their products are not needed. Other genes that are normally activated by MeCP2 remain inactive leading to a lack of gene product. This defect probably disrupts the normal functioning of nerve cells, leading to the signs and symptoms of Rett syndrome.

Rett syndrome is mainly found in girls with a prevalence of around 1 in every 10,000; male fetuses with normal karyotypes afflicted with this condition rarely survive to term and if so, usually die shortly after birth. Patients are born with very hard to find signs of a disorder, but after about six months to a year and half, speech and motor function capabilities start to decrease. This is followed by seizures, growth retardation and cognitive and motor impairment. The MECP2 locus is X-linked and the disease-causing alleles are dominant. Due to its prevalence in females, it has been linked to male lethality, or to a predominant transmission with the paternal X chromosome; nevertheless, in rare cases some males can also be affected by Rett syndrome. Males with gene duplications of MECP-2 at the Xq28 locus are also at risk for recurrent infections & meningitis in infancy.

Mutations in the MECP2 gene have also been identified in people with several other disorders affecting the central nervous system. For example, MECP2 mutations are associated with some cases of moderate to severe X-linked intellectual disability. Mutations in the gene have also been found in males with severe brain dysfunction (neonatal encephalopathy) who live only into early childhood. In addition, several people with features of both Rett syndrome and Angelman syndrome (a condition characterized by intellectual disability, problems with movement, and inappropriate laughter and excitability) have mutations in the MECP2 gene. Lastly, MECP2 mutations or changes in the gene's activity have been reported in some cases of autism (a developmental disorder that affects communication and social interaction).

More recent studies reported genetic polymorphisms in the MeCP2 gene in patients with systemic lupus erythematosus (SLE). SLE is a systemic autoimmune disease that can affect multiple organs. MeCP2 polymorphisms have been reported so far in European-derived and Asian lupus patients.

The genetic loss of MECP2 has been identified as changing the properties of cells in the locus ceruleus, the exclusive source of noradrenergic innervation to the cerebral cortex and hippocampus.

Researchers have concluded that "Because these neurons are a pivotal source of norepinephrine throughout the brainstem and forebrain and are involved in the regulation of diverse functions disrupted in Rett syndrome, such as respiration and cognition, we hypothesize that the locus ceruleus is a critical site at which loss of MECP2 results in CNS dysfunction."

== Interactive pathway map ==
Click on genes, proteins and metabolites below to visit related articles. (Note: The interactive pathway map can be edited at WikiPathways: "WP3584".)

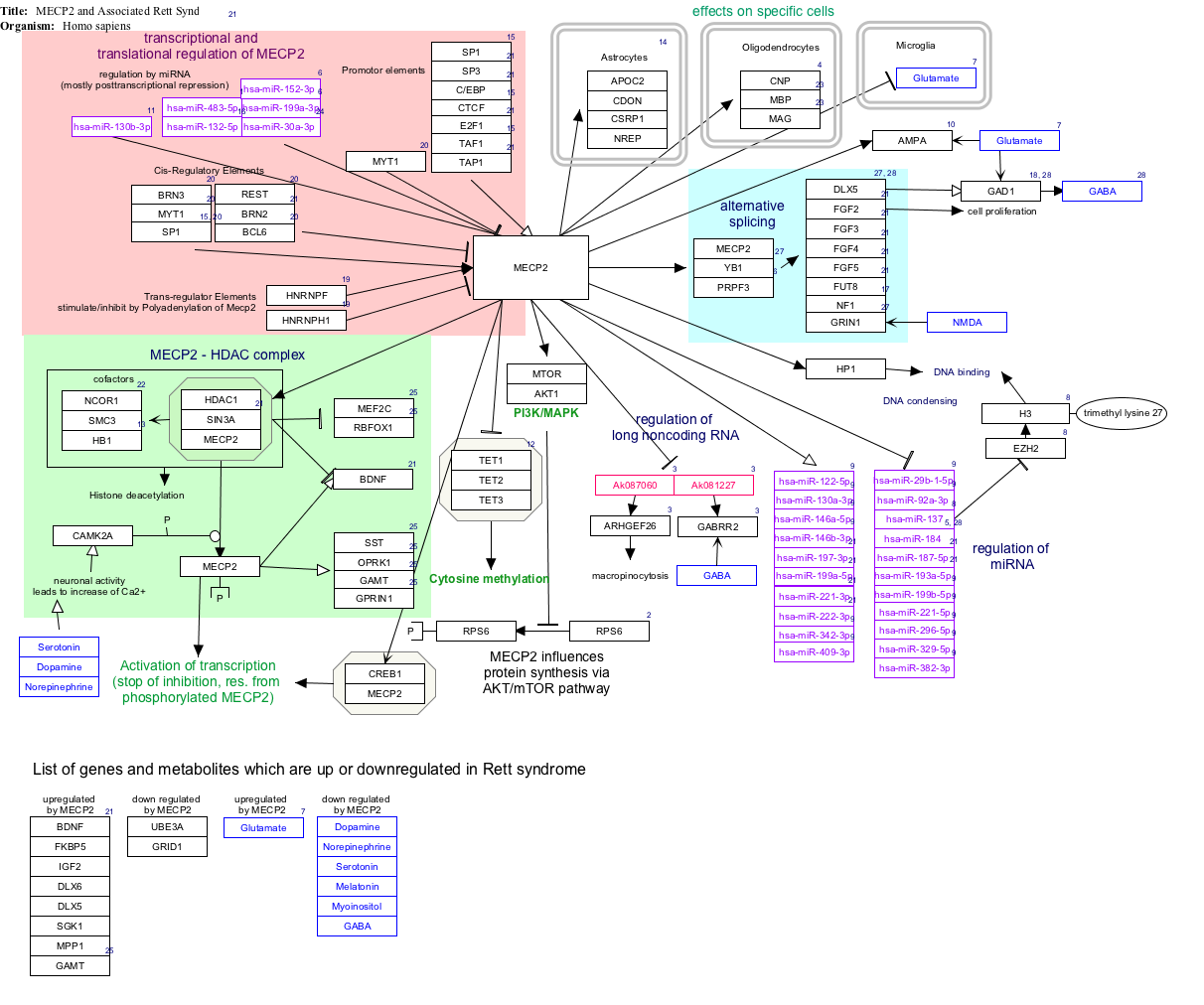

MECP2 and associated Rett syndrome edit

== Interactions ==
MECP2 has been shown to interact with SKI protein and Nuclear receptor co-repressor 1. In neuronal cells the MECP2 mRNA is thought to interact with miR-132, which silences the expression of the protein. This forms part of a homeostatic mechanism that could regulate MECP2 levels in the brain.

MECP2 has been shown to be phosphorylated by MSK1 following BDNF induction.

== Hormones ==
MeCP2 in the developing rat brain regulates important social development in a sexually dimorphic manner. MeCP2 levels are different between males and females in the developing rat brain 24 hours after birth within the amygdala and hypothalamus, but this difference is no longer observed 10 days after birth. Specifically, males express less MeCP2 than females, and this aligns with the steroid-sensitive time period of the neonatal rat brain. Reductions in MeCP2 with small interfering RNA (siRNA) during the first few days of life reduce male levels of juvenile social play behavior to female typical levels, but do not affect female juvenile play behavior.

MeCP2 is important in organizing hormone-related behaviors and sex differences in the developing rat amygdala. MeCP2 appears to regulate arginine vasopressin (AVP) and androgen receptor (AR) production in male rats but not in females. Vasopressin is known to regulate many social behaviors including pair bonding and social recognition. While male rats typically have higher levels of vasopressin in the amygdala, MeCP2 reduction during the first 3 days of life causes a lasting reduction of vasopressin to female typical levels in this brain region that lasted through adulthood. Male rats with reduced MeCP2 levels also show a significant reduction of AR at two weeks following infusion, but this effect is gone by adulthood.

== Early life stress ==
MeCP2 monitors the response to early life stress. Early life stress is correlated with hyper-phosphorylation of the MeCP2 protein in paraventricular nucleus of the hypothalamus. This thus causes a reduced occupancy of MeCP2 at the AVP gene's promoter region, and therefore elevated levels of AVP. Vasopressin is a primary hormone involved in the Hypothalmic-Pituitary-Adrenal Axis, the connectivity in the brain that regulates processing of and reaction to stress. Decreased functioning of the MeCP2 protein thus upregulates the neuronal stress response.

== Post-translational modifications ==
MeCP2 is regulated by several post-translational modifications, including phosphorylation. Phosphorylation at serine 80 (S80) is enriched at resting neurons and contributes to the association of MeCP2 with chromatin, whereas neuronal activity induces its desphosphorylation. In contrast, neuronal activity induces phosphorylation of MeCP2 at serine 421 (S421) through calcium dependent signaling, providing a mechanism by which MeCP2 activity can be dynamically regulated in response to neuronal stimulation.
