= Zimmermann–Laband syndrome =

- Other names: Laband–Zimmermann syndrome, and Laband's syndrome
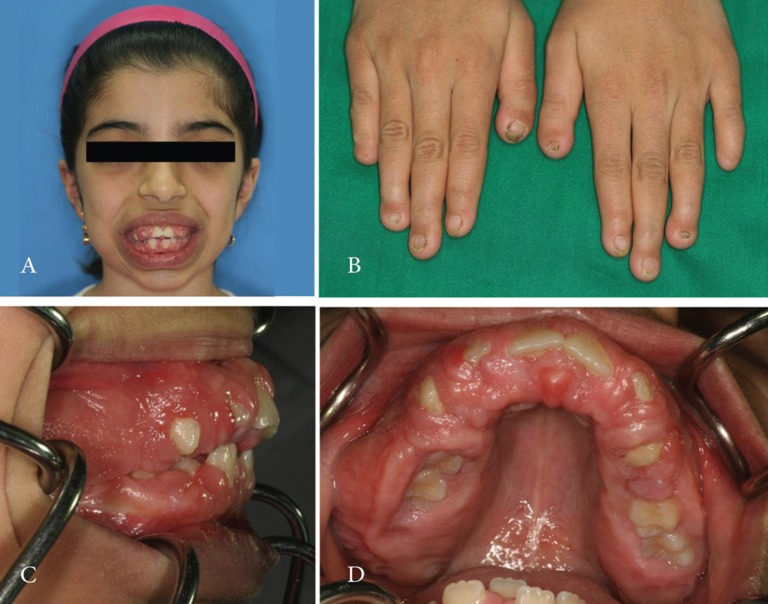
- Patient with Zimmermann-Laband syndrome, showing characteristic features such as coarse facies, hypoplastic nails, and gum hypertrophy
- Specialty: Medical genetics

Zimmermann–Laband syndrome (ZLS) is two different conditions (ZLS, type 1 and ZLS, type 2) that share similar clinical features. It is an extremely rare, autosomal dominant congenital disorder.

== Etymology ==
The term Zimmermann–Laband was coined by Carl Jacob Witkop in 1971.

== Symptoms and signs ==
Clinical features include gingival fibromatosis, hypoplasia of the distal phalanges, nail dysplasia, joint hypermobility, and sometimes hepatosplenomegaly. The nose and pinnae are usually large and poorly developed, which give individuals with the syndrome characteristic facial features. Intellectual disability may also be seen. Gingival fibromatosis is usually present at birth or appears shortly thereafter. Both males and females are equally affected.

== Genetics ==
Type 1 ZLS is caused by pathogenic variants (mutations) in a potassium channel gene – KCNH1. Similar pathogenic variants in this gene were previously found to cause Temple–Baraitser syndrome, which shares similar clinical features. This has led many to believe that ZLS, type 1 and TBS are actually the same disorder.

Type 2 ZLS is caused by pathogenic variants in the brain isoform of V-type proton ATPase subunit B, ATP6V1B2.

Zimmerman–Laband syndrome is inherited in an autosomal dominant pattern. This means the gene is located on an autosome, and having only one copy of a gene mutation is sufficient to cause the disorder. Individuals with the disorder have a 50% chance of passing it on to their offspring in each pregnancy.

== Management ==
There is no known cure for ZLS. Affected individuals should see a pediatrician or adult physician at least annually to monitor growth, development and general health and well being. Developmental potential is maximized through the use of physiotherapy, occupational therapy and speech pathology. Anticonvulsants are used to control epilepsy, when present.

== See also ==
- List of cutaneous conditions
