= SCN2A =

Protein-coding gene in the species Homo sapiens

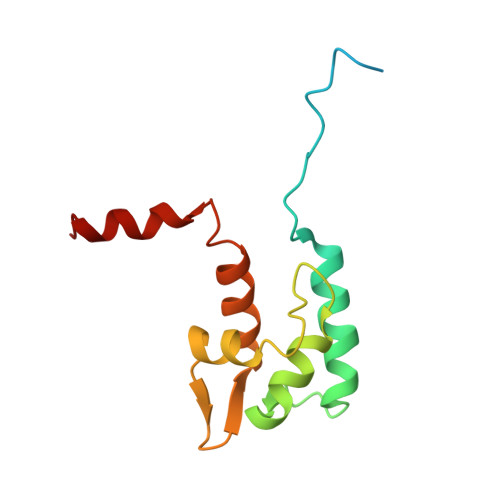

Identifiers
- Aliases: SCN2A, BFIC3, BFIS3, BFNIS, EIEE11, HBA, HBSCI, HBSCII, NAC2, Na(v)1.2, Nav1.2, SCN2A1, SCN2A2, sodium voltage-gated channel alpha subunit 2, DEE11, EA9
- External IDs: OMIM: 182390; MGI: 98248; GeneCards: SCN2A
Available structures
PDB	Ortholog search: PDBe RCSB
PDB	List of PDB id codes 2KAV, 4JPZ

Gene location (Human)
Chr.	Chromosome 2 (human)
Band	2q24.3	Start	165,194,993 bp
Band	2q24.3	End	165,392,310 bp

Gene location (Mouse)
Chr.	Chromosome 2 (mouse)
Band	2 C1.3|2 38.61 cM	Start	65,451,115 bp
Band	2 C1.3|2 38.61 cM	End	65,597,791 bp
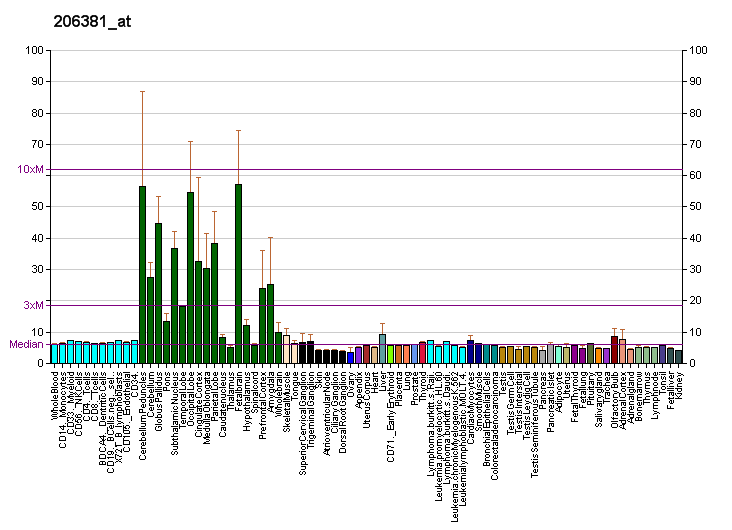
RNA expression pattern
Bgee	Human / Mouse (ortholog); Top expressed in: middle temporal gyrus; Brodmann area 23; cerebellar vermis; entorhinal cortex; cerebellar hemisphere; parietal lobe; postcentral gyrus; superior frontal gyrus; right hemisphere of cerebellum; endothelial cell / Top expressed in: piriform cortex; lobe of cerebellum; cerebellar vermis; primary motor cortex; amygdala; anterior amygdaloid area; dorsomedial hypothalamic nucleus; subiculum; cingulate gyrus; ventromedial nucleus; More reference expression data
BioGPS	More reference expression data
Gene ontology
Molecular function	sodium channel activity; voltage-gated ion channel activity; ion channel activity; voltage-gated sodium channel activity
Cellular component	voltage-gated sodium channel complex; integral component of membrane; membrane; intrinsic component of plasma membrane; sodium channel complex; plasma membrane; node of Ranvier; integral component of plasma membrane; intracellular anatomical structure; intercalated disc; T-tubule; axon; paranode region of axon; glutamatergic synapse; integral component of presynaptic membrane
Biological process	membrane depolarization during action potential; sodium ion transport; regulation of ion transmembrane transport; ion transport; transmembrane transport; myelination; neuronal action potential; sodium ion transmembrane transport; nervous system development; intrinsic apoptotic signaling pathway in response to osmotic stress; neuron apoptotic process; memory; cellular response to hypoxia
Sources:Amigo / QuickGO
Orthologs
Databases	NCBI: entry; OMA: entry
Species	Human	Mouse
Entrez	6326	110876
Ensembl	ENSG00000136531	ENSMUSG00000075318
UniProt	Q99250	B1AWN6
RefSeq (mRNA)	NM_001040142; NM_001040143; NM_021007; NM_001371246; NM_001371247	NM_001099298; NM_001346679; NM_001346680
RefSeq (protein)	NP_001035232; NP_001035233; NP_066287; NP_001358175; NP_001358176	NP_001092768; NP_001333608; NP_001333609
Location (UCSC)	Chr 2: 165.19 – 165.39 Mb	Chr 2: 65.45 – 65.6 Mb
PubMed search
- Wikidata
View/Edit Human	View/Edit Mouse

Sodium channel protein type 2 subunit alpha, also known as Na_{v}1.2, is an ion channel protein encoded by the SCN2A gene in humans. It represents one member of the sodium channel alpha subunit gene family. The SCN2A gene is located on chromosome 2 (2q24.3) in proximity to two other voltage-gated sodium channel genes, namely SCN1A and SCN9A. Na_{v}1.2 is distributed throughout the human central nervous system where it plays a major role in the initiation and propagation of action potentials. It is absent from peripheral tissues, with the exception of enteric neurons. Pathologic mutations in the SCN2A gene cause a broad spectrum of neurological conditions, such as epilepsy, autism spectrum disorder (ASD), intellectual disability (ID) and/or developmental delay, called SCN2A-related disorders.

== Structure ==
The SCN2A gene is composed of 27 exons and comprises more than 150 kilobases. There are two major splice variants known, a neonatal isoform and an adult isoform, which differ in one amino acid at position 209 (Asn versus Asp). The neonatal isoform might limit neuronal excitability during development. The voltage-gated sodium channel Na_{v}1.2 encoded by the SCN2A gene consists of 2005 amino acids. This single polypeptide forms a pseudotetrameric channel of four similar domains (I - IV) where each domain contains 6 transmembrane segments, including a voltage sensing region, a pore forming region and an ion-selectivity filter. In the living organism, Na_{v}1.2 is a transmembrane glycoprotein complex composed of a large alpha subunit (encoded by the SCN2A gene) and one or more regulatory beta subunits (encoded by SCNxB genes).

== Function ==
The principal function of Na_{v}1.2, similar to other members of the voltage-gated sodium channel family, is to mediate sodium influx into neurons upon membrane depolarization, thereby generating and propagating action potentials across distinct neuronal subtypes.

Na_{v}1.2 functions mainly in excitatory neurons in cortical structures similar to Na_{v}1.6, whereas expression of Na_{v}1.1 (encoded by the SCN1A gene) is found in mutual distinct, inhibitory neuronal classes. However, the distribution of Na_{v}1.2 changes during development. Na_{v}1.2 channels are initially expressed at the axon initial segments (the site of action potential initiation) of excitatory pyramidal cells in both hippocampal and cortical excitatory cells. While these levels remain constant in the hippocampus, in cortical excitatory cells, Nav1.2 becomes restricted to the portion of the axon initial segment closest to the cell body and in dendrites at the age of 1–2 years in humans. Na_{v}1.6 gradually becomes the predominant channel type at the distal axon initial segment and axonal nodes of Ranvier. In mature neurons, Na_{v}1.2 is distributed only throughout unmyelinated axons. In contrast, its expression pattern in the cerebellum seems to persist throughout development, suggesting distinct roles for Na_{v}1.2 in mature neurons of the neocortex and cerebellum. When Na_{v}1.6 takes over the initiation of action potentials, Na_{v}1.2 might play a crucial role in driving their backpropagation into dendrites. This backpropagation could impact activity-dependent processes such as synaptic maturation, plasticity, and gene transcription.

The activity of Na_{v}1.2 is influenced by several factors, such as protein-protein interactions, posttranslational modifications (e.g. phosphorylation, palmitoylation), and changes in intracellular Ca2+ concentration.

== Clinical significance ==
Mutations in the SCN2A gene can cause a broad spectrum of disorders collectively referred to as SCN2A-related disorders. These include cases of ASD, self-limited epilepsy, early infantile developmental and epileptic encephalopathy, later onset developmental and epileptic encephalopathy, infantile spasms, SCN2A-related disorders without epilepsy, episodic ataxia, and further movement disorders. Two major groups of SCN2A mutations can be distinguished based on their functional consequences and response to seizure medication: gain of function mutations, typically associated with seizure onset within the first three months of life, and loss of function mutations, in which seizures begin after the first three months or may never occur. The former group tends to benefit from treatment with sodium channel blockers, whereas in the latter, such treatment is often ineffective or may even exacerbate seizures. Notably, SCN2A is known to be the most prominent genetic risk factor for autism-spectrum-disorders.

SCN2A gene mutations have also been identified in bitemporal glucose hypometabolism, and bipolar disorder. Furthermore, mutations in SCN2A have been demonstrated to impair enteric neuron migration during development, which may result in gastrointestinal dysmotility, consistent with gastric motility symptoms reported in ASD patients with underlying SCN2A mutations.

== See also ==
- paralytic - SCN2A ortholog in Drosophila
