= Meat =

Animal flesh eaten as food

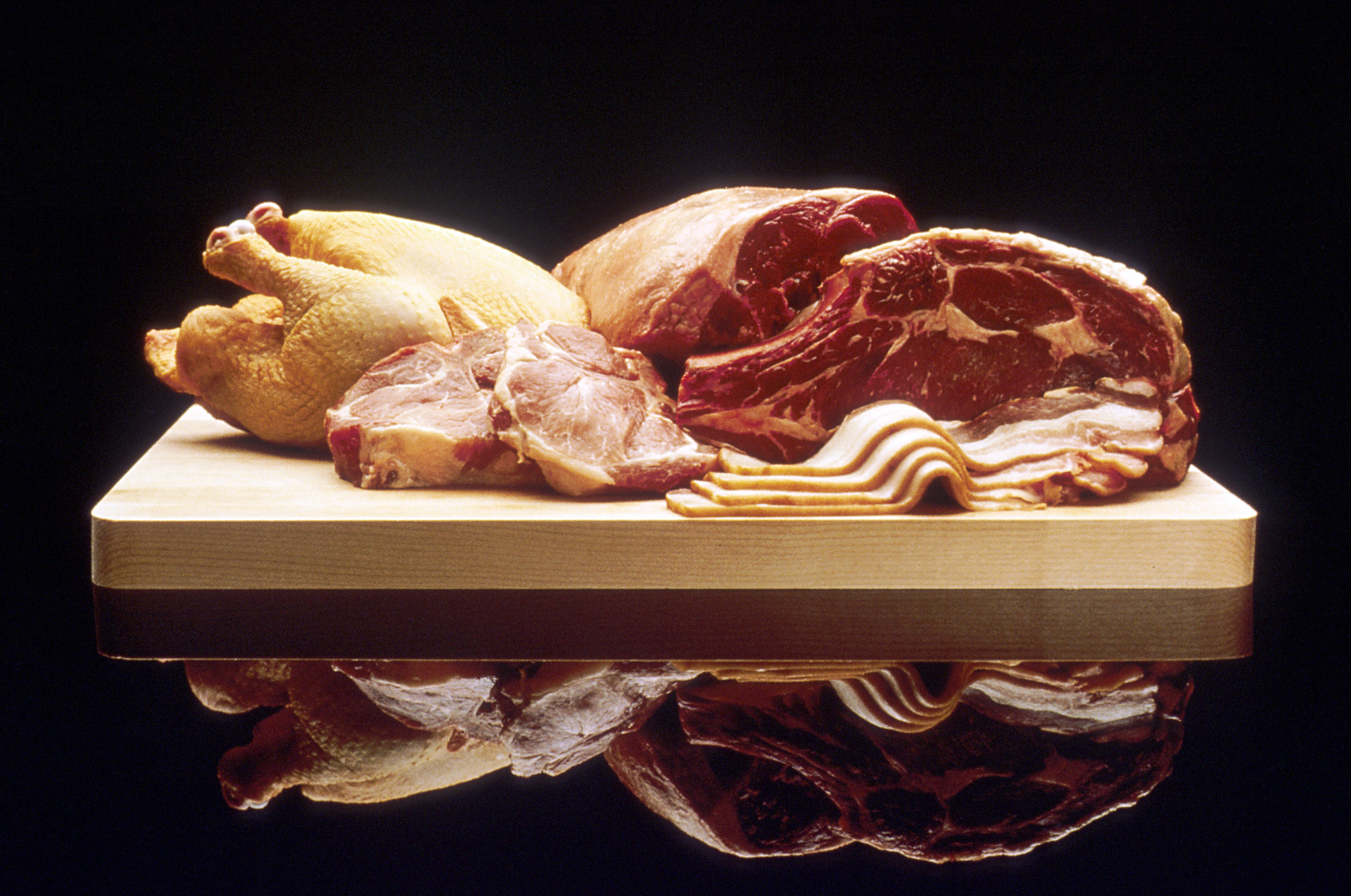
Raw meat (clockwise from left): chicken, beef, bacon, pork chops

Meat is animal tissue, mostly muscle, that is eaten as food. Humans have hunted and farmed other animals for meat since prehistory. The Neolithic Revolution allowed the domestication of vertebrates, including chickens, sheep, goats, pigs, horses, and cattle, starting around 11,000 years ago. Since then, selective breeding has enabled farmers to produce meat with the qualities desired by producers and consumers. Meat is important to economies, cultures and faiths around the world.

Meat is mainly composed of water, protein, and fat. Its quality is affected by many factors, including the genetics, health, and nutritional status of the animal involved. Without preservation, bacteria and fungi decompose and spoil unprocessed meat within hours or days. Meat is edible raw, but it is mostly eaten cooked, such as by stewing or roasting, or processed, such as by smoking or salting.

The consumption of meat (especially red and processed meat, as opposed to fish and poultry) increases the risk of certain negative health outcomes including cancer, coronary heart disease, and diabetes. Meat production significantly harms the environment by contributing to global warming, pollution, and biodiversity loss. Some people (vegetarians and vegans) choose not to eat meat for ethical, environmental, health or religious reasons.

== Etymology ==
The word meat comes from the Old English word mete, meaning food in general. In modern usage, meat primarily means skeletal muscle with its associated fat and connective tissue, but it can include offal, here meaning other edible organs such as liver and kidney. The term is sometimes used in a more restrictive sense to mean the flesh of mammalian species (pigs, cattle, sheep, goats, etc.) raised and prepared for human consumption, to the exclusion of fish, other seafood, insects, poultry, or other animals.

== History ==
=== Domestication ===
Paleontological evidence suggests that meat constituted a substantial proportion of the diet of the earliest humans. Early hunter-gatherers depended on the organized hunting of large animals such as bison and deer. Animals were domesticated in the Neolithic, enabling the systematic production of meat and the breeding of animals to improve meat production.

Major animal domestications
Animal	Centre of origin	Purpose	Date/years ago
Goat, sheep, pig, cow	Near East, South Asia	Food	11,000–10,000
Chicken	East Asia	Cockfighting	7,000
Horse	Central Asia	Draft, riding	5,500

=== Intensive animal farming ===
In the postwar period, governments gave farmers guaranteed prices to increase animal production. The effect was to raise output at the cost of increased inputs such as of animal feed and veterinary medicines, as well as of animal disease and environmental pollution. In 1966, the United States, the United Kingdom and other industrialized nations, began factory farming of beef and dairy cattle and domestic pigs. Intensive animal farming became globalized in the later years of the 20th century, replacing traditional stock rearing in countries around the world. In 1990 intensive animal farming accounted for 30% of world meat production and by 2005, this had risen to 40%.

=== Selective breeding ===
Modern agriculture employs techniques such as progeny testing to speed selective breeding, allowing the rapid acquisition of the qualities desired by meat producers. For instance, in the wake of well-publicized health concerns associated with saturated fats in the 1980s, the fat content of United Kingdom beef, pork and lamb fell from 20–26 percent to 4–8 percent within a few decades, due to both selective breeding for leanness and changed methods of butchery. Methods of genetic engineering that could improve the meat-producing qualities of animals are becoming available.

Meat production continues to be shaped by the demands of customers. The trend towards selling meat in pre-packaged cuts has increased the demand for larger breeds of cattle, better suited to producing such cuts. Animals not previously exploited for their meat are now being farmed, including mammals such as antelope, zebra, water buffalo and camel, as well as non-mammals, such as crocodile, emu and ostrich. Organic farming supports an increasing demand for meat produced to that standard.

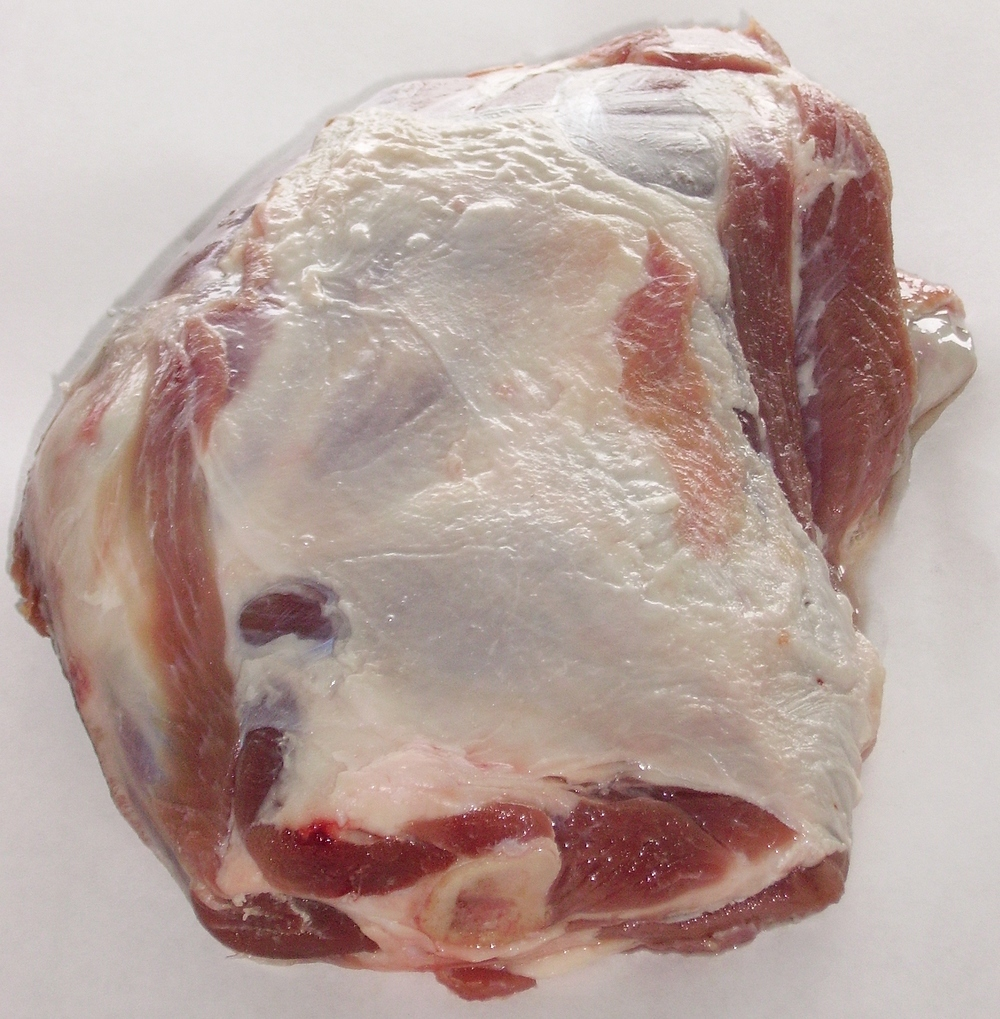
A shoulder of lamb

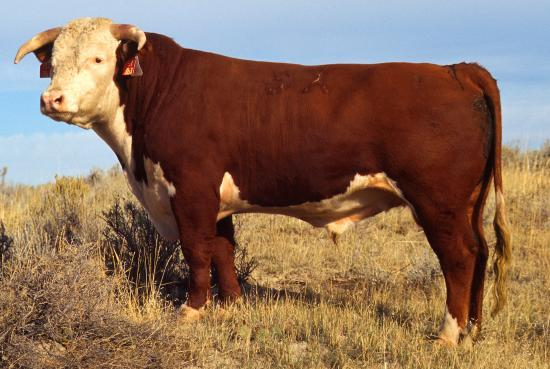
A Hereford bull, a breed of beef cattle

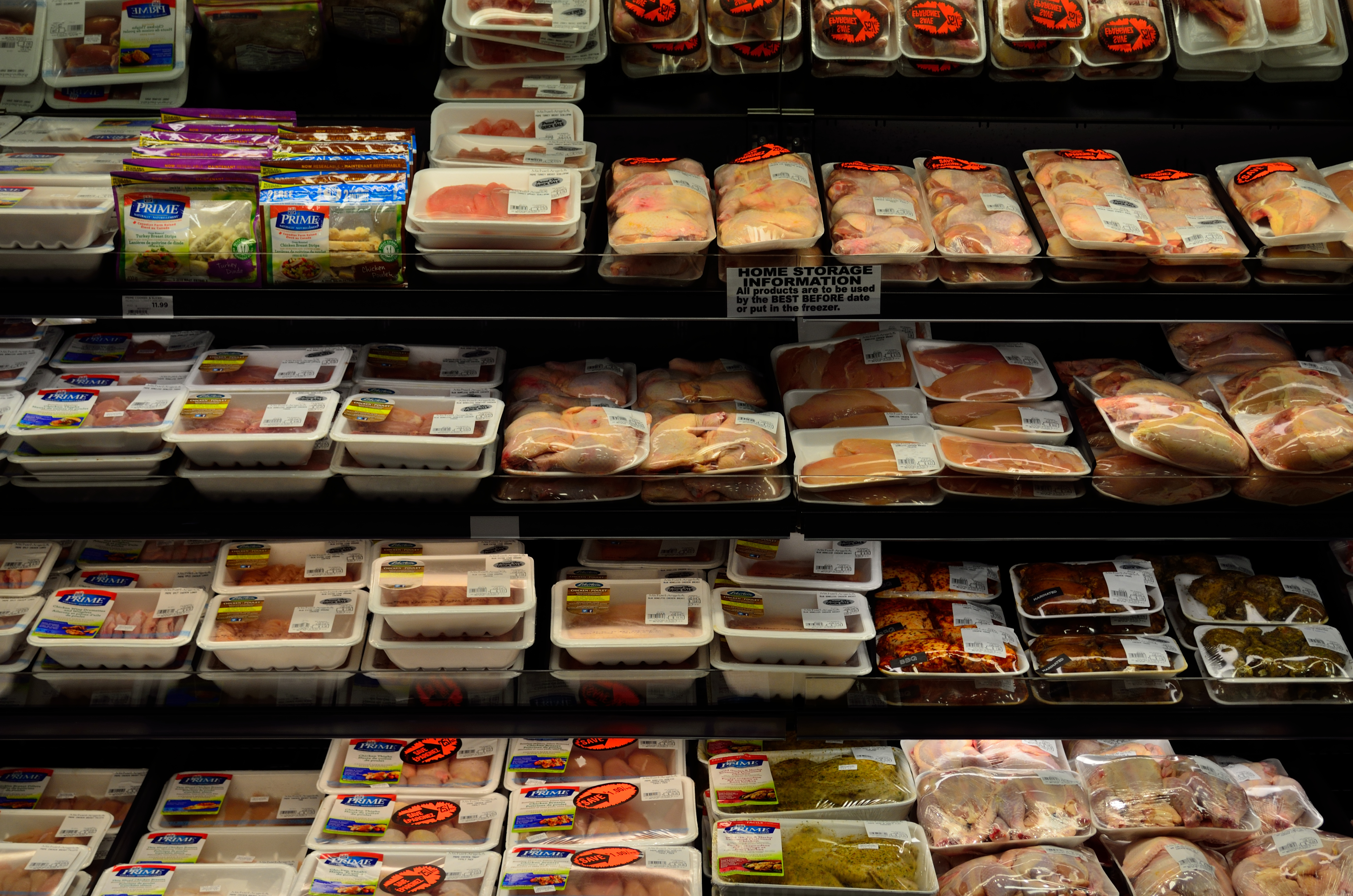
Supermarket meat, North America

== Animal growth and development ==
Several factors affect the growth and development of meat.

=== Genetics ===
Trait	Heritability
Reproductive efficiency	2–10%
Meat quality	15–30%
Growth	20–40%
Muscle/fat ratio	40–60%

Some economically important traits in meat animals are heritable to some degree, and can thus be selected for by animal breeding. In cattle, certain growth features are controlled by recessive genes which have not so far been excluded, complicating breeding. One such trait is dwarfism; another is the doppelender or "double muscling" condition, which causes muscle hypertrophy and thereby increases the animal's commercial value. Genetic analysis continues to reveal the mechanisms that control numerous aspects of the endocrine system and, through it, meat growth and quality.

Genetic engineering can shorten breeding programs significantly because they allow for the identification and isolation of genes coding for desired traits, and for the reincorporation of these genes into the animal genome. To enable this, the genomes of many animals are being mapped. Some research has already seen commercial application. For instance, a recombinant bacterium has been developed which improves the digestion of grass in the rumen of cattle, and some features of muscle fibers have been genetically altered. Experimental reproductive cloning of commercially important meat animals such as sheep, pig or cattle has been successful. Asexual reproduction of animals bearing desirable traits is anticipated.

=== Environment ===
Heat regulation in livestock is of economic significance, as mammals attempt to maintain a constant optimal body temperature. Low temperatures tend to prolong animal development and high temperatures tend to delay it. Depending on their size, body shape and insulation through tissue and fur, some animals have a relatively narrow zone of temperature tolerance and others (e.g. cattle) a broad one. Static magnetic fields, for reasons still unknown, retard animal development.

=== Animal nutrition ===
The quality and quantity of usable meat depends on the animal's plane of nutrition, i.e., whether it is over- or underfed. Scientists disagree about how exactly the plane of nutrition influences carcase composition.

The composition of the diet, especially the amount of protein provided, is an important factor regulating animal growth. Ruminants, which may digest cellulose, are better adapted to poor-quality diets, but their ruminal microorganisms degrade high-quality protein if supplied in excess. Because producing high-quality protein animal feed is expensive, several techniques are employed or experimented with to ensure maximum utilization of protein. These include the treatment of feed with formalin to protect amino acids during their passage through the rumen, the recycling of manure by feeding it back to cattle mixed with feed concentrates, or the conversion of petroleum hydrocarbons to protein through microbial action.

In plant feed, environmental factors influence the availability of crucial nutrients or micronutrients, a lack or excess of which can cause a great many ailments. In Australia, where the soil contains limited phosphate, cattle are fed additional phosphate to increase the efficiency of beef production. Also in Australia, cattle and sheep in certain areas were often found losing their appetite and dying in the midst of rich pasture; this was found to be a result of cobalt deficiency in the soil. Plant toxins are a risk to grazing animals; for instance, sodium fluoroacetate, found in some African and Australian plants, kills by disrupting the cellular metabolism. Some man-made pollutants such as methylmercury and some pesticide residues present a particular hazard as they bioaccumulate in meat, potentially poisoning consumers.

=== Animal welfare ===
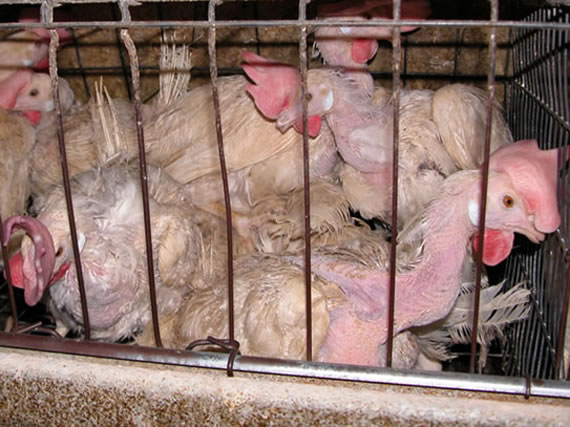
The welfare of farm animals such as hens in battery cages and other systems is debated.

Practices such as confinement in factory farming have generated concerns for animal welfare. Animals have abnormal behaviors such as tail-biting, cannibalism, and feather pecking. Invasive procedures such as beak trimming, castration, and ear notching have similarly been questioned. Breeding for high productivity may affect welfare, as when broiler chickens are bred to be very large and to grow rapidly. Broilers often have leg deformities and become lame, and many die from the stress of handling and transport.

=== Human intervention ===
Meat producers may seek to improve the fertility of female animals through the administration of gonadotrophic or ovulation-inducing hormones. In pig production, sow infertility is a common problem – possibly due to excessive fatness. No methods currently exist to augment the fertility of male animals. Artificial insemination is now routinely used to produce animals of the best possible genetic quality, and the efficiency of this method is improved through the administration of hormones that synchronize the ovulation cycles within groups of females.

Growth hormones, particularly anabolic agents such as steroids, are used in some countries to accelerate muscle growth in animals. This practice has given rise to the beef hormone controversy, an international trade dispute. It may decrease the tenderness of meat, although research on this is inconclusive, and have other effects on the composition of the muscle flesh. Where castration is used to improve control over male animals, its side effects can be counteracted by the administration of hormones. Myostatin has been used to produce muscle hypertrophy.

Sedatives may be administered to animals to counteract stress factors and increase weight gain. The feeding of antibiotics to certain animals increases growth rates. This practice is particularly prevalent in the US, but has been banned in the EU, partly because it causes antimicrobial resistance in pathogenic microorganisms.

== Composition ==
=== Biochemical ===
The biochemical composition of meat varies in complex ways depending on the species, breed, sex, age, plane of nutrition, training and exercise of the animal, as well as on the anatomical location of the musculature involved. Even between animals of the same litter and sex there are considerable differences in such parameters as the percentage of intramuscular fat.

Adult mammalian muscle consists of roughly 75 percent water, 19 percent protein, 2.5 percent intramuscular fat, 1.2 percent carbohydrates and 2.3 percent other soluble substances. These include organic compounds, especially amino acids, and inorganic substances such as minerals. Muscle proteins are either soluble in water (sarcoplasmic proteins, about 11.5 percent of total muscle mass) or in concentrated salt solutions (myofibrillar proteins, about 5.5 percent of mass). There are several hundred sarcoplasmic proteins. Most of them – the glycolytic enzymes – are involved in glycolysis, the conversion of sugars into high-energy molecules, especially adenosine triphosphate (ATP). The two most abundant myofibrillar proteins, myosin and actin, form the muscle's overall structure and enable it to deliver power, consuming ATP in the process. The remaining protein mass includes connective tissue (collagen and elastin). Fat in meat can be either adipose tissue, used by the animal to store energy and consisting of "true fats" (esters of glycerol with fatty acids), or intramuscular fat, which contains phospholipids and cholesterol.

=== Nutritional ===
Muscle tissue is high in protein, containing all the essential amino acids, and for example red meat is a good source of vitamin B_{12}, selenium, niacin, vitamin B_{6}, and iron. Several forms of meat are high in vitamin K. Muscle tissue is very low in carbohydrates and does not contain dietary fiber.

The fat content of meat varies widely with the species and breed of animal, the way in which the animal was raised, what it was fed, the part of the body, and the methods of butchering and cooking. Wild animals such as deer are leaner than farm animals, leading those concerned about fat content to choose game such as venison. Decades of breeding meat animals for fatness is being reversed by consumer demand for leaner meat. Small amounts – in the range 3%–7% – of fat deposited near the muscle fibers ("marbling") in meats can slightly improve perceived flavour, juiciness and tenderness, but contribute no more than about 5% to overall palatability. Fat around meat further contains cholesterol. The increase in meat consumption after 1960 is associated with significant imbalances of fat and cholesterol in the human diet.

Nutritional content of 110 g (1/4 lb); data vary widely with selection (e.g. skinless, boneless) and preparation
Source	Energy: kJ (kcal)	Protein	Carbs	Fat
Chicken breast	490 (117)	25 g	0 g	2 g
Lamb mince	1,330 (319)	19 g	0 g	26 g
Beef mince	1,200 (287)	19 g	0 g	22 g
Dog	1,100 (270)	20 g	0 g	22 g
Horse	610 (146)	23 g	0 g	5 g
Pork loin	1,010 (242)	14 g	0 g	30 g
Rabbit	900 (215)	32 g	0 g	9 g

== Production ==
World production of meat by main items

World production of main meat items by main producers (2023)

Land Animals Killed for Meat, 2013
Animals	Number Killed
Chickens	61,171,973,510
Ducks	2,887,594,480
Pigs	1,451,856,889
Rabbits	1,171,578,000
Geese	687,147,000
Turkeys	618,086,890
Sheep	536,742,256
Goats	438,320,370
Cattle	298,799,160
Rodents	70,371,000
Other birds	59,656,000
Buffalo	25,798,819
Horses	4,863,367
Donkeys, mules	3,478,300
Camelids	3,298,266

Biomass of mammals on Earth
1. Livestock, mostly cattle and pigs (60.0%)
2. Humans (36.0%)
3. Wild mammals (4.00%)

=== Transport ===
Upon reaching a predetermined age or weight, livestock are usually transported en masse to the slaughterhouse. Depending on its length and circumstances, this may exert stress and injuries on the animals, and some may die en route. Unnecessary stress in transport may adversely affect the quality of the meat. In particular, the muscles of stressed animals are low in water and glycogen, and their pH fails to attain acidic values, all of which results in poor meat quality.

=== Slaughter ===
Animals are usually slaughtered by being first stunned and then exsanguinated (bled out). Death results from the one or the other procedure, depending on the methods employed. Stunning can be effected through asphyxiating the animals with carbon dioxide, shooting them with a gun or a captive bolt pistol, or shocking them with electric current. The exsanguination is accomplished by severing the carotid artery and the jugular vein in cattle and sheep, and the anterior vena cava in pigs. Draining as much blood as possible from the carcass is necessary because blood causes the meat to have an unappealing appearance and is a breeding ground for microorganisms.

=== Dressing and cutting ===
After exsanguination, the carcass is dressed; that is, the head, feet, hide (except hogs and some veal), excess fat, viscera and offal are removed, leaving only bones and edible muscle. Cattle and pig carcases, but not those of sheep, are then split in half along the mid ventral axis, and the carcase is cut into wholesale pieces. The dressing and cutting sequence, long a province of manual labor, is being progressively automated.

=== Conditioning ===
Under hygienic conditions and without other treatment, meat can be stored at above its freezing point (−1.5 °C) for about six weeks without spoilage, during which time it undergoes an aging process that increases its tenderness and flavor. During the first day after death, glycolysis continues until the accumulation of lactic acid causes the pH to reach about 5.5. The remaining glycogen, about 18 g per kg, increases the water-holding capacity and tenderness of cooked meat.

Rigor mortis sets in a few hours after death as adenosine triphosphate is used up. This causes the muscle proteins actin and myosin to combine into rigid actomyosin. This in turn lowers the meat's water-holding capacity, so the meat loses water or "weeps". In muscles that enter rigor in a contracted position, actin and myosin filaments overlap and cross-bond, resulting in meat that becomes tough when cooked. Over time, muscle proteins denature in varying degree, with the exception of the collagen and elastin of connective tissue, and rigor mortis resolves. These changes mean that meat is tender and pliable when cooked just after death or after the resolution of rigor, but tough when cooked during rigor.

As the muscle pigment myoglobin denatures, its iron oxidizes, which may cause a brown discoloration near the surface of the meat. Ongoing proteolysis contributes to conditioning: hypoxanthine, a breakdown product of ATP, contributes to meat's flavor and odor, as do other products of the decomposition of muscle fat and protein.

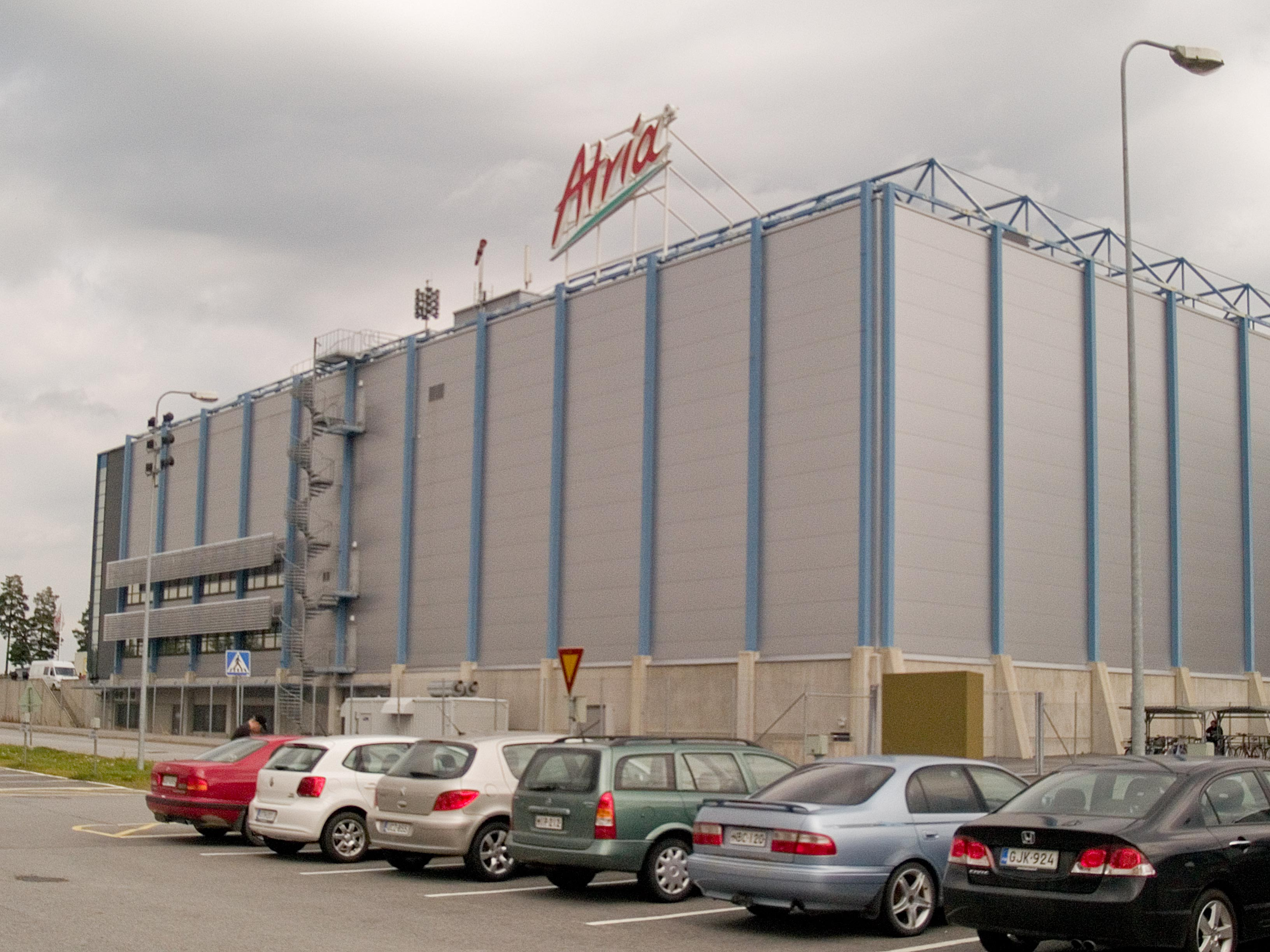
A slaughterhouse, Finland

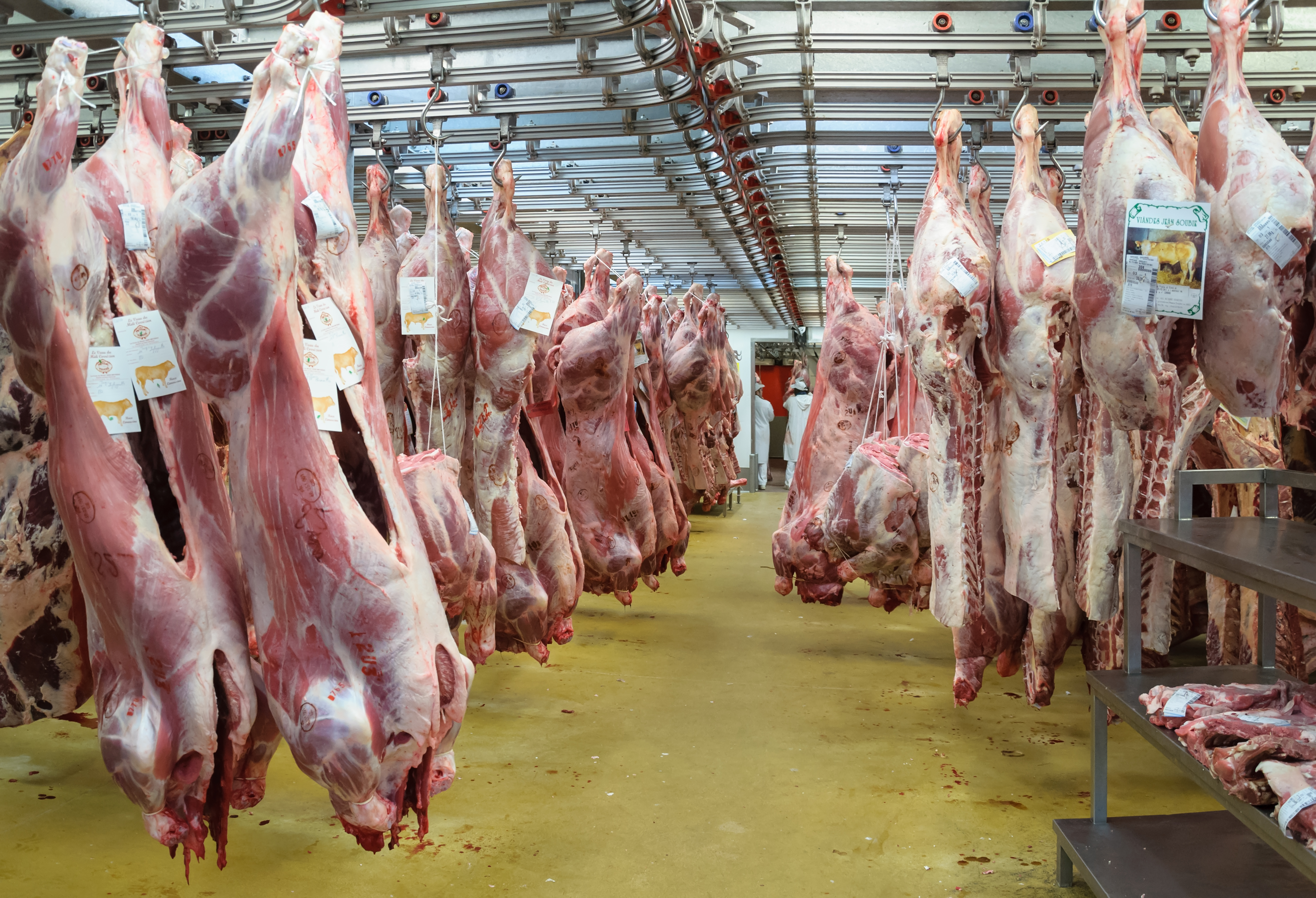
Rungis International Market, France

=== Additives ===
When meat is industrially processed, additives are used to protect or modify its flavor or color, to improve its tenderness, juiciness or cohesiveness, or to aid with its preservation.

Additives used in industrial meat processing
Additive	Examples	Function	Notes
Salt	n/a	Imparts flavor, inhibits microbial growth, extends the product's shelf life and helps emulsifying finely processed products, such as sausages.	The most common additive. Ready-to-eat meat products often contain 1.5 to 2.5 percent salt.
Nitrite	n/a	Curing meat, to stabilize color and flavor, and inhibit growth of spore-forming microorganisms such as Clostridium botulinum.	The use of nitrite's precursor nitrate is now limited to a few products such as dry sausage, prosciutto or parma ham.
Alkaline polyphosphates	Sodium tripolyphosphate	Increase the water-binding and emulsifying ability of meat proteins, limit lipid oxidation and flavor loss, and reduce microbial growth.	
Ascorbic acid (vitamin C)	n/a	Stabilize the color of cured meat.	
Sweeteners	Sugar, corn syrup	Impart a sweet flavor, bind water and assist surface browning during cooking in the Maillard reaction.	
Seasonings	Spices, herbs, essential oils	Impart or modify flavor.	
Flavorings	Monosodium glutamate	Strengthen existing flavors.	
Tenderizers	Proteolytic enzymes, acids	Break down collagen to make the meat more palatable for consumption.	
Antimicrobials	lactic, citric and acetic acid, calcium sulfate, cetylpyridinium chloride, lactoferrin, bacteriocins such as nisin.	Limit growth of meat spoilage bacteria	
Antioxidants		Limit lipid oxidation, which would create an undesirable "off flavor".	Used in precooked meat products.
Acidifiers	Lactic acid, citric acid	Impart a tangy or tart flavor note, extend shelf-life, tenderize fresh meat or help with protein denaturation and moisture release in dried meat.	They substitute for the process of natural fermentation that acidifies some meat products such as hard salami or prosciutto.

== Consumption ==
=== Historical ===
A bioarchaeological (specifically, isotopic analysis) study of early medieval England found, based on the funerary record, that high-meat protein diets were extremely rare, and that (contrary to previously held assumptions) elites did not consume more meat than non-elites, and men did not consume more meat than women.

In the nineteenth century, meat consumption in Britain was the highest in Europe, exceeded only by that in British colonies. In the 1830s consumption per head in Britain was about 34 kilograms (75 lb) a year, rising to 59 kilograms (130 lb) in 1912. In 1904, laborers consumed 39 kilograms (87 lb) a year while aristocrats ate 140 kilograms (300 lb). There were some 43,000 butcher's shops in Britain in 1910, with "possibly more money invested in the meat industry than in any other British business" except finance. The US was a meat importing country by 1926.

Truncated lifespan as a result of intensive breeding allows more meat to be produced from fewer animals. The world cattle population was about 600 million in 1929, with 700 million sheep and goats and 300 million pigs.

Meat supply per person

Meat production tonnes

=== Trends ===
According to the Food and Agriculture Organization, the overall consumption for white meat has increased from the 20th to the 21st centuries. Poultry meat has increased by 76.6% per kilo per capita and pig meat by 19.7%. Bovine meat has decreased from 10.4 kg (22 lb 15 oz) per capita in 1990 to 9.6 kg (21 lb 3 oz) per capita in 2009. 370 million tonnes were produced in 2023, 60% more than in 2000. Although many species are raised for meat, three species accounted for nearly 90% of global production between 2000 and 2023: chicken, pig and cattle. With 34.2% of the global production in 2023, chicken meat was the most produced and showed the largest growth since 2000 (+116%, or 68 million tonnes). Pig meat represented 33.7% of the total in 2023, compared with 38% in 2000.

Overall, diets that include meat are the most common worldwide according to the results of a 2018 Ipsos MORI study of 16–64 years olds in 28 countries. Ipsos states "An omnivorous diet is the most common diet globally, with non-meat diets (which can include fish) followed by over a tenth of the global population." Approximately 87% of people include meat in their diet in some frequency. 73% of meat eaters included it in their diet regularly and 14% consumed meat only occasionally or infrequently.

The type of meat consumed varies between different cultures. The amount and kind of meat consumed varies by income, both between countries and within a given country. Horses are commonly eaten in countries such as France, Italy, Germany and Japan. Horses and other large mammals such as reindeer were hunted during the late Paleolithic in western Europe. Dogs are consumed in China, South Korea and Vietnam. Dogs are occasionally eaten in the Arctic regions. Historically, dog meat has been consumed in various parts of the world, such as Hawaii, Japan, Switzerland and Mexico. Cats are sometimes eaten, such as in Peru. Guinea pigs are raised for their flesh in the Andes. Whales and dolphins are hunted, partly for their flesh, in several countries. Misidentification sometimes occurs; in 2013, products in Europe labelled as beef actually contained horse meat.

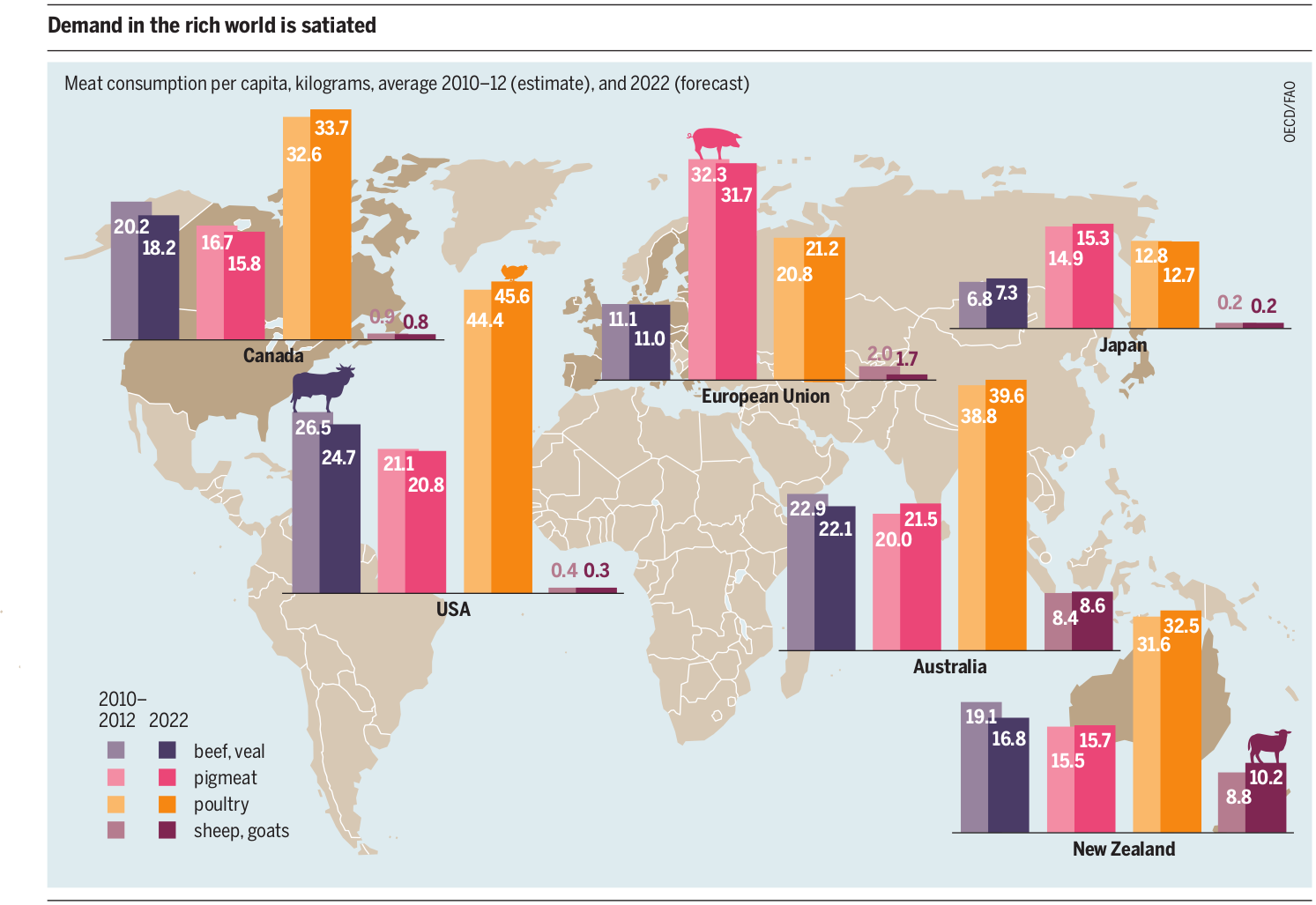
While meat consumption in most industrialized countries is at high, stable levels...

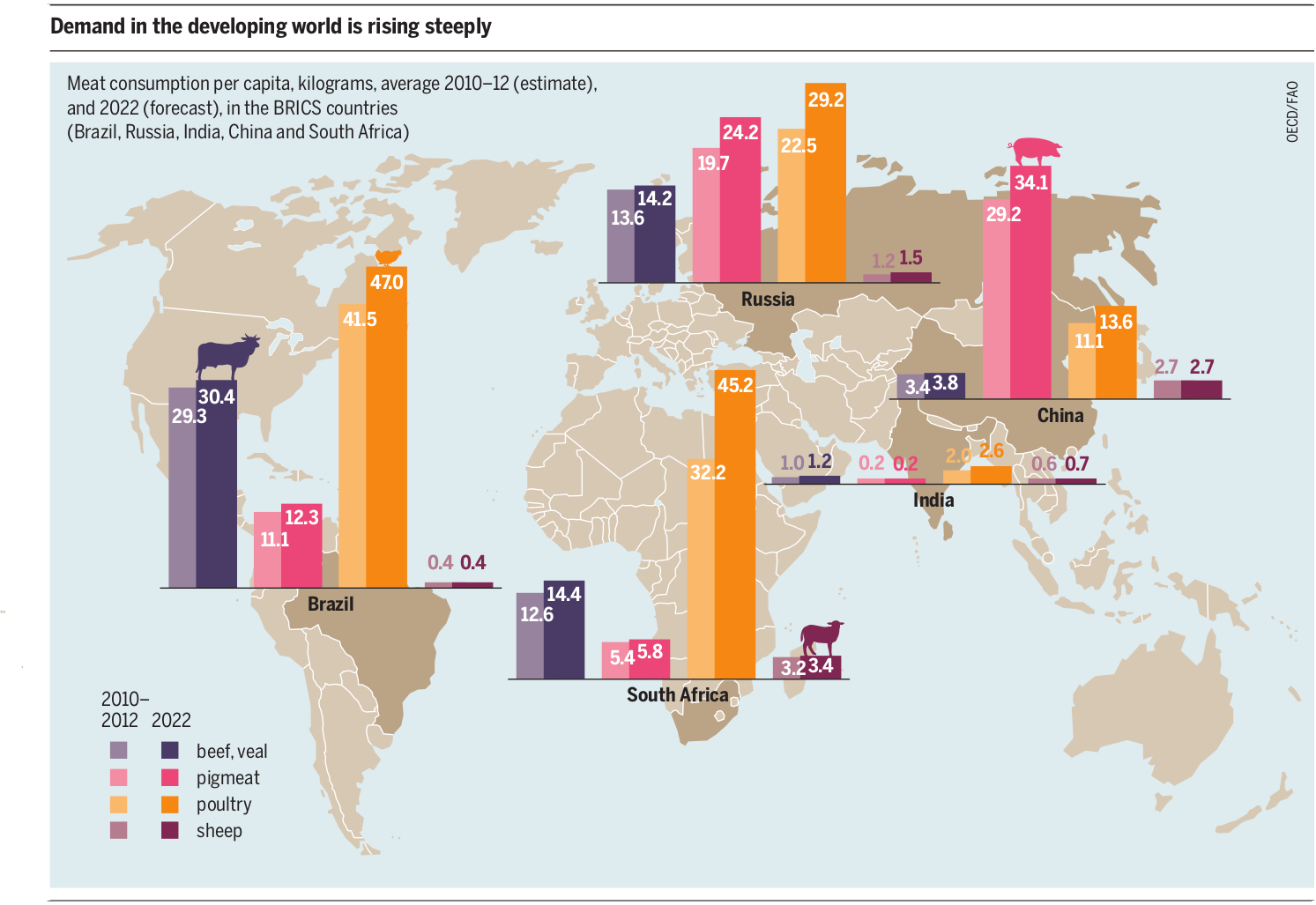
... it is rising in emerging economies.

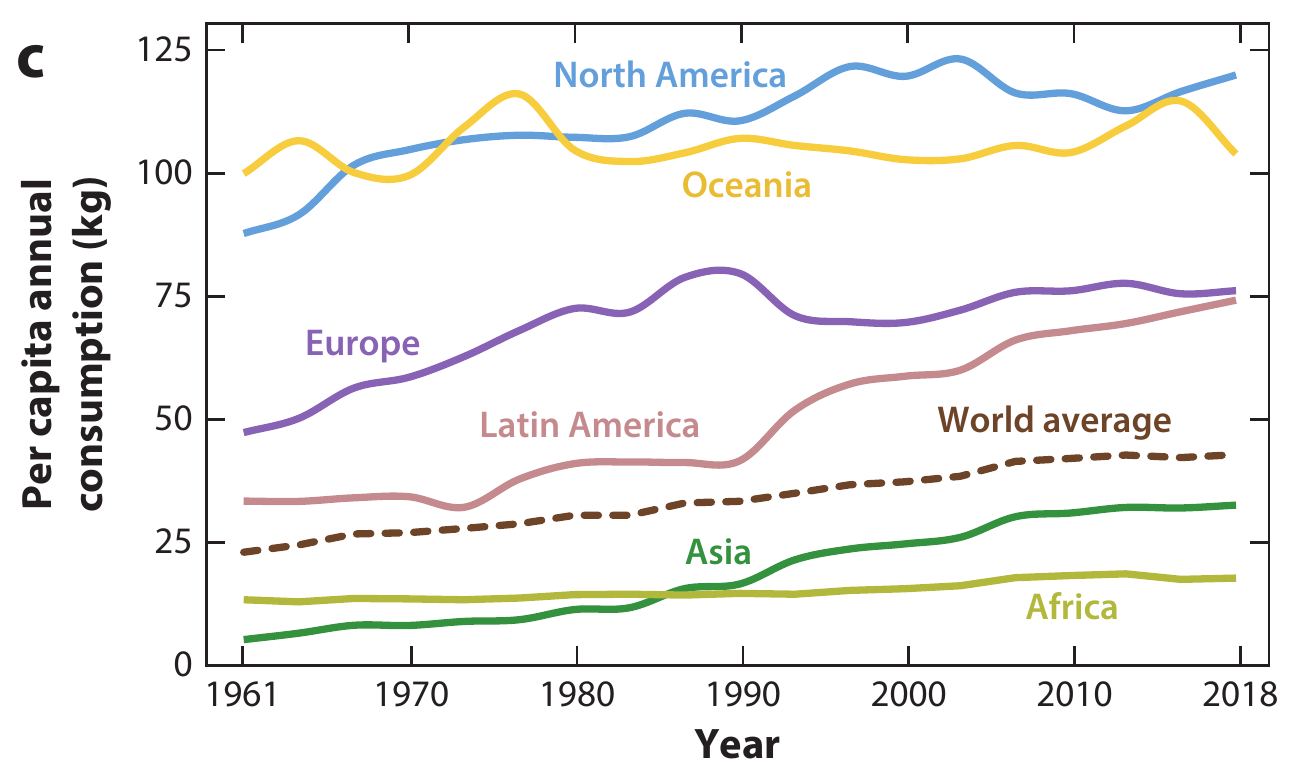
Per capita annual meat consumption by region

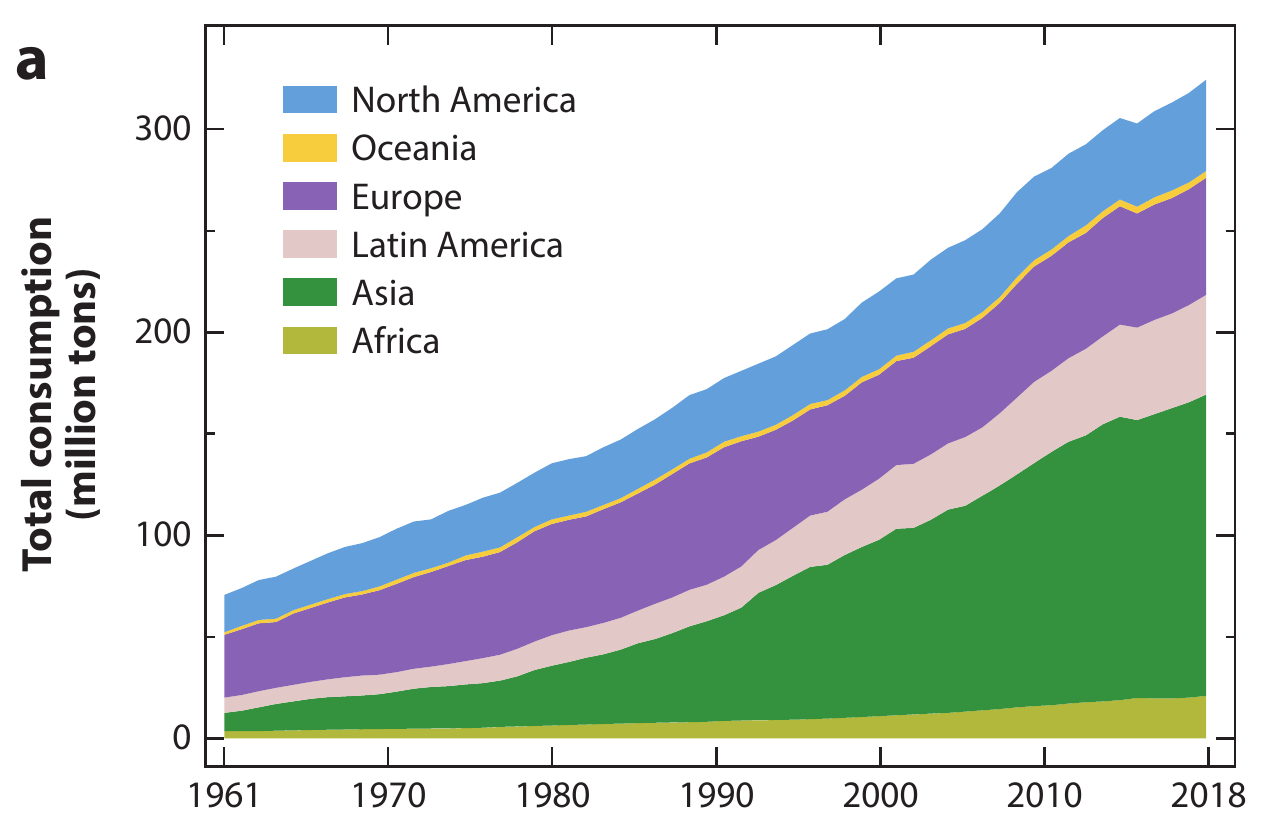
Total annual meat consumption by region

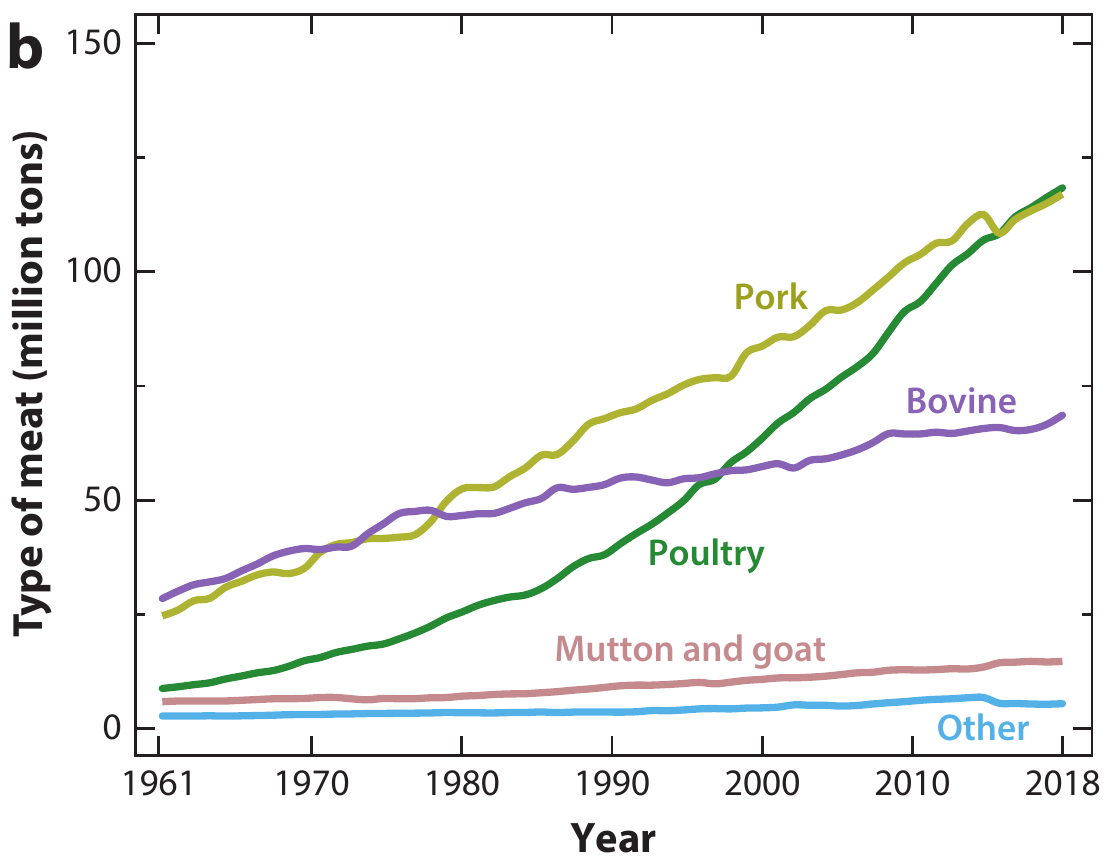
Total annual meat consumption by type of meat

=== Methods of preparation ===
Meat can be cooked in many ways, including braising, broiling, frying, grilling, and roasting. Meat can be cured by smoking, which preserves and flavors food by exposing it to smoke from burning or smoldering wood. Other methods of curing include pickling, salting, and air-drying. Some recipes call for raw meat; steak tartare is made from minced raw beef. Pâtés are made with ground meat and fat, often including liver.

Types of meat and techniques used to prepare it

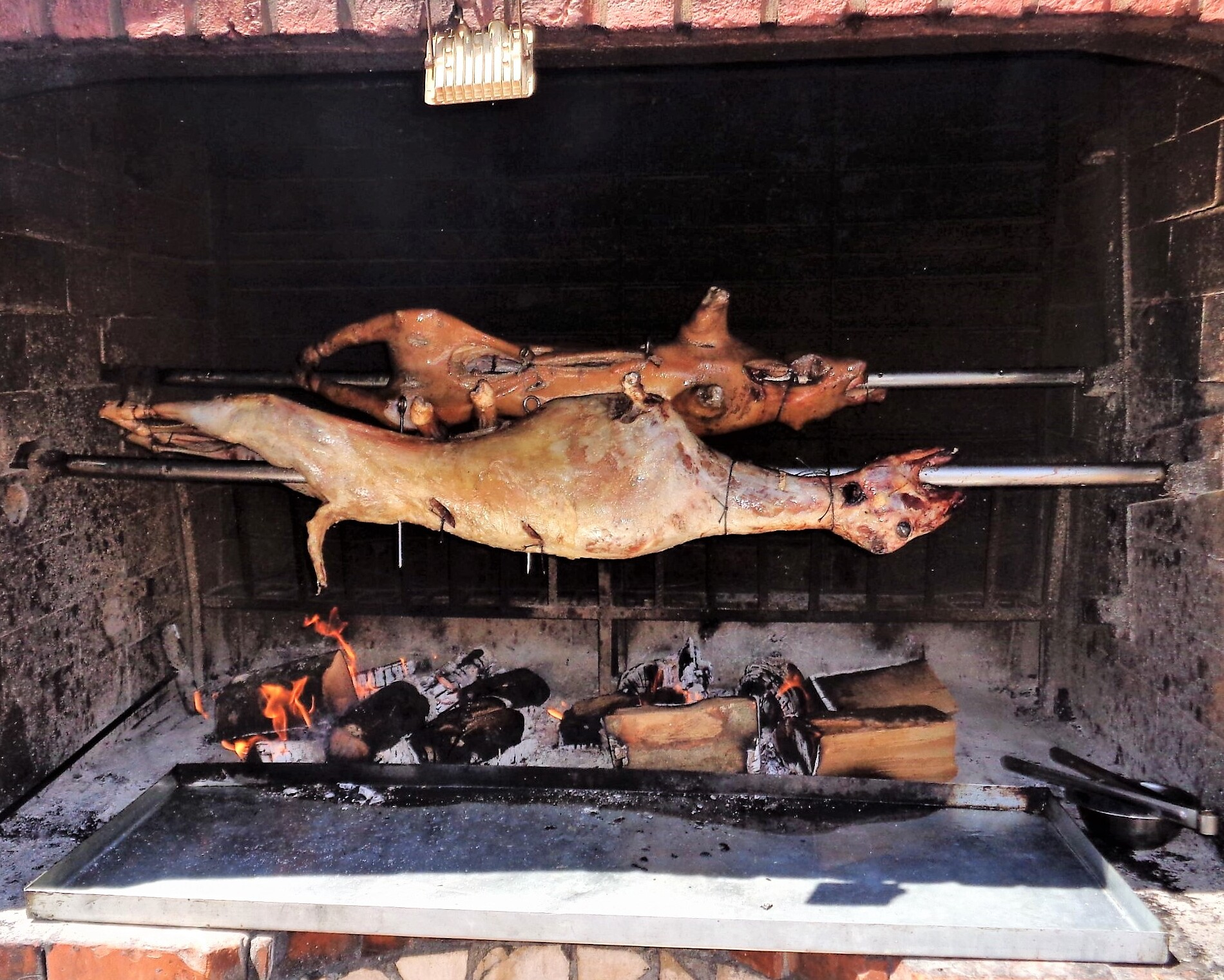
Spit-roasting a lamb and a suckling pig

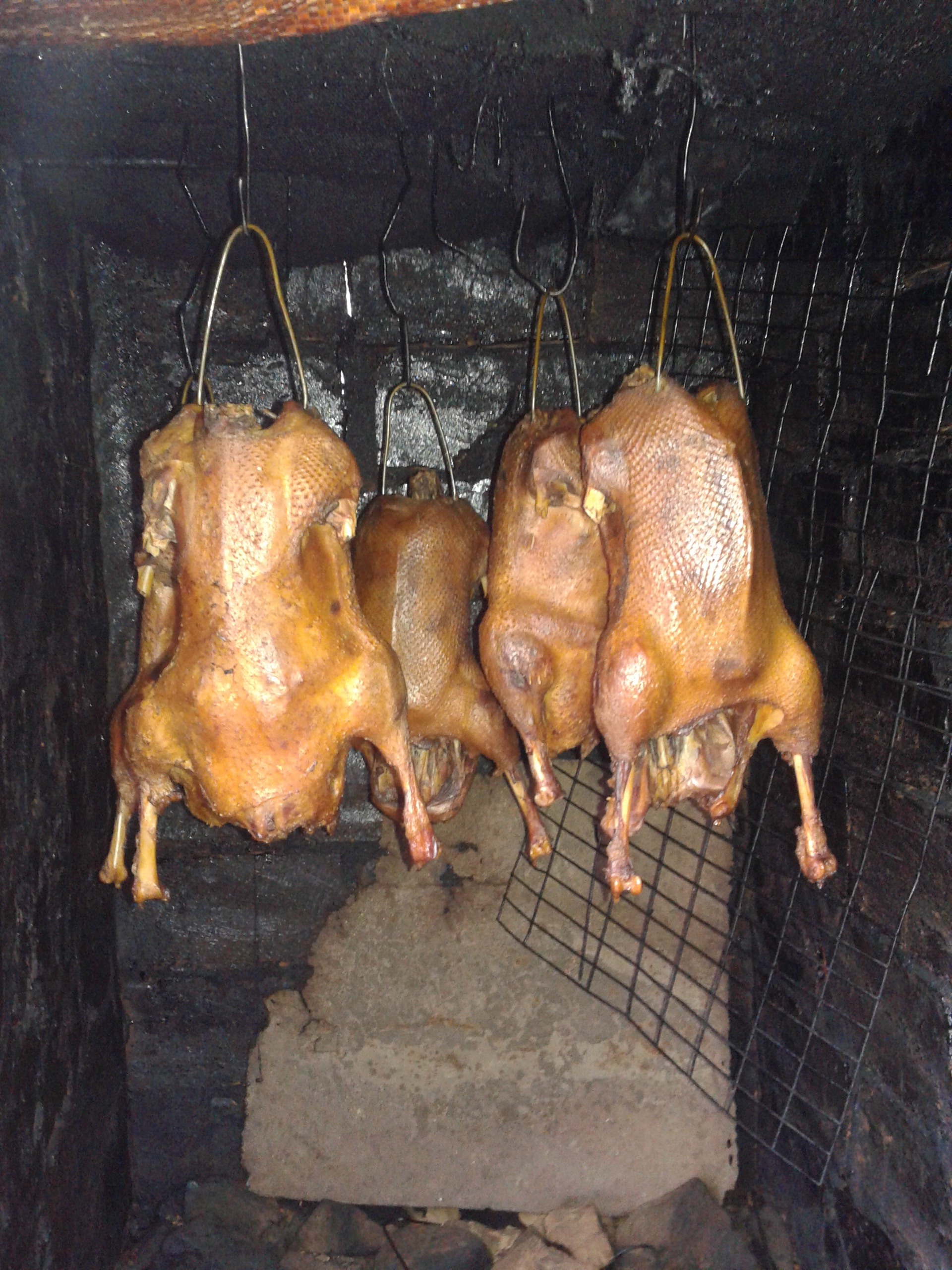
Geese being smoked in a smokehouse

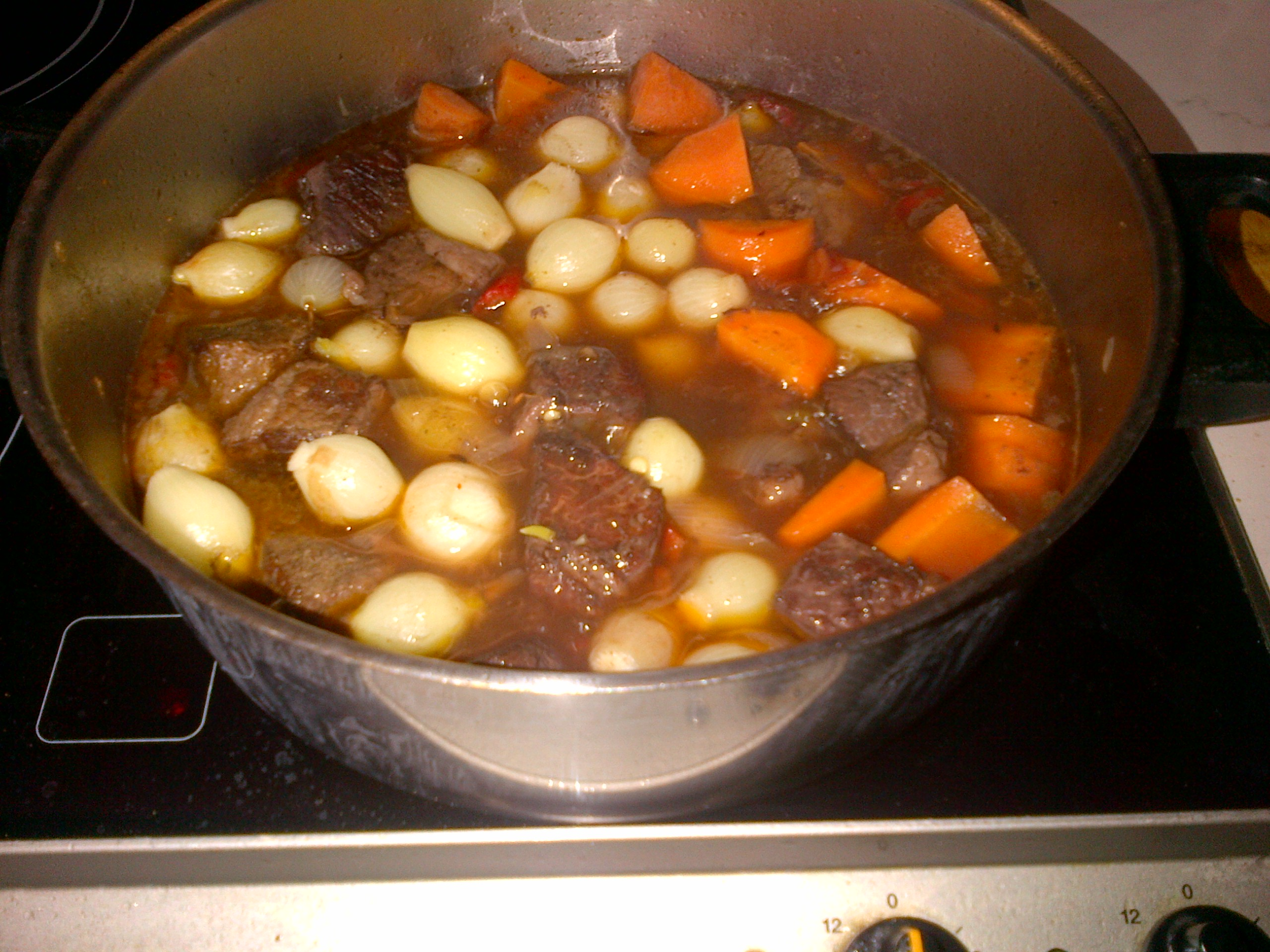
Stewing mutton with vegetables

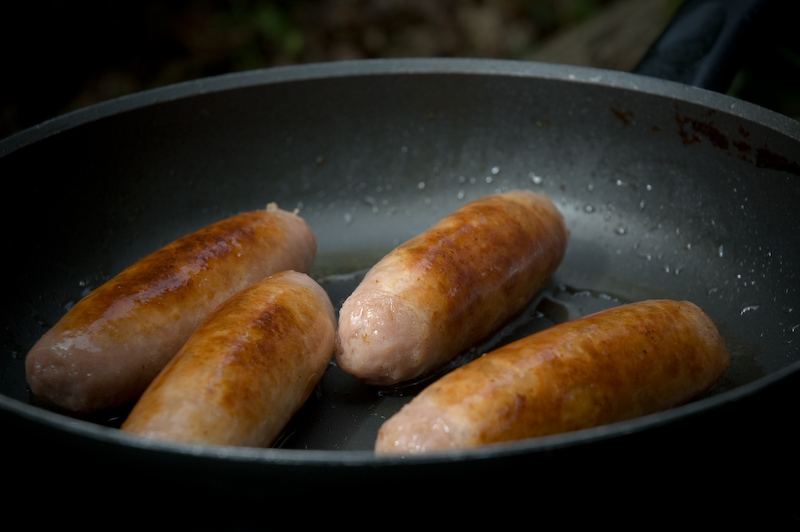
Frying pork sausages in a pan

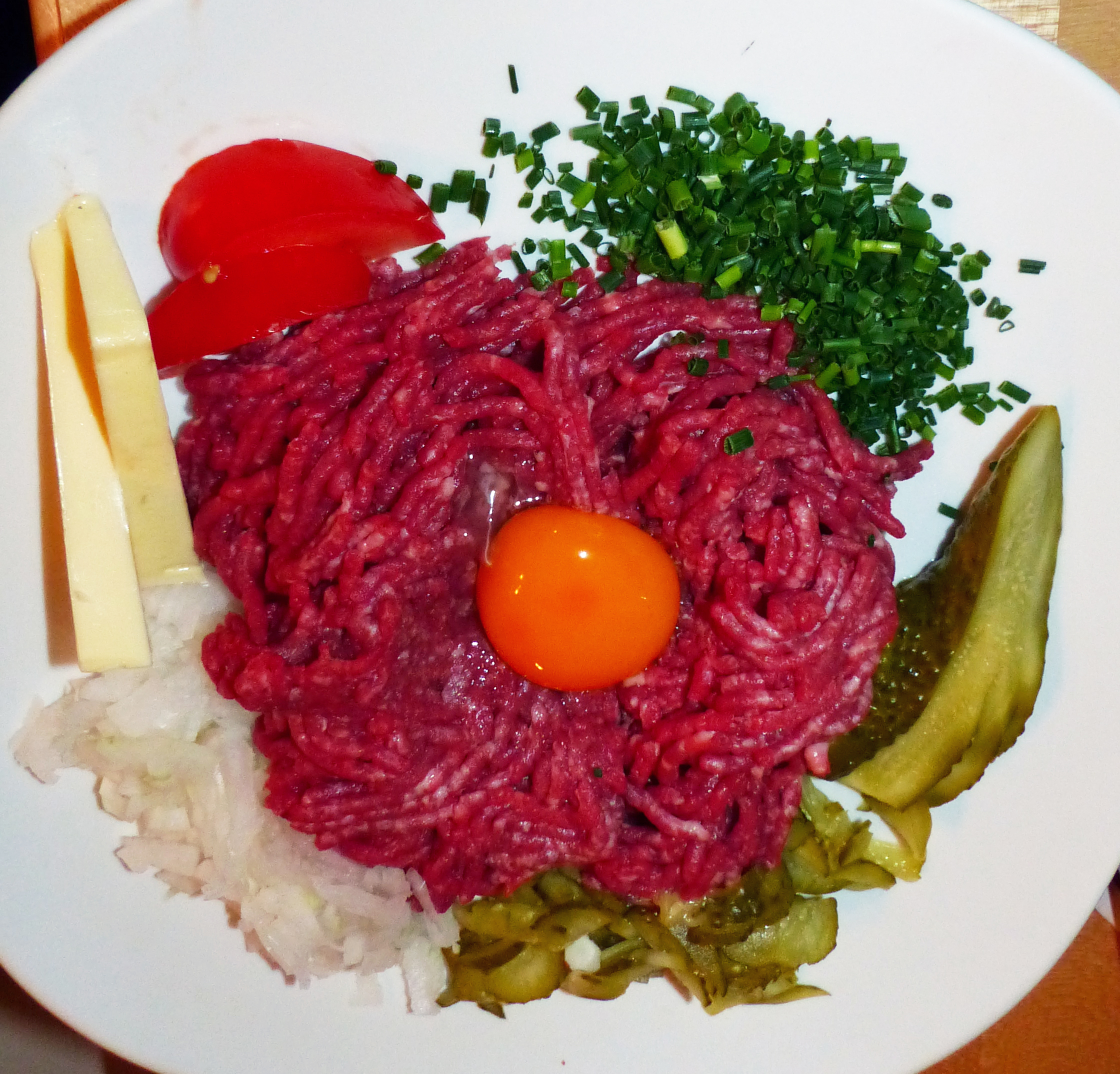
Raw beef: steak tartare

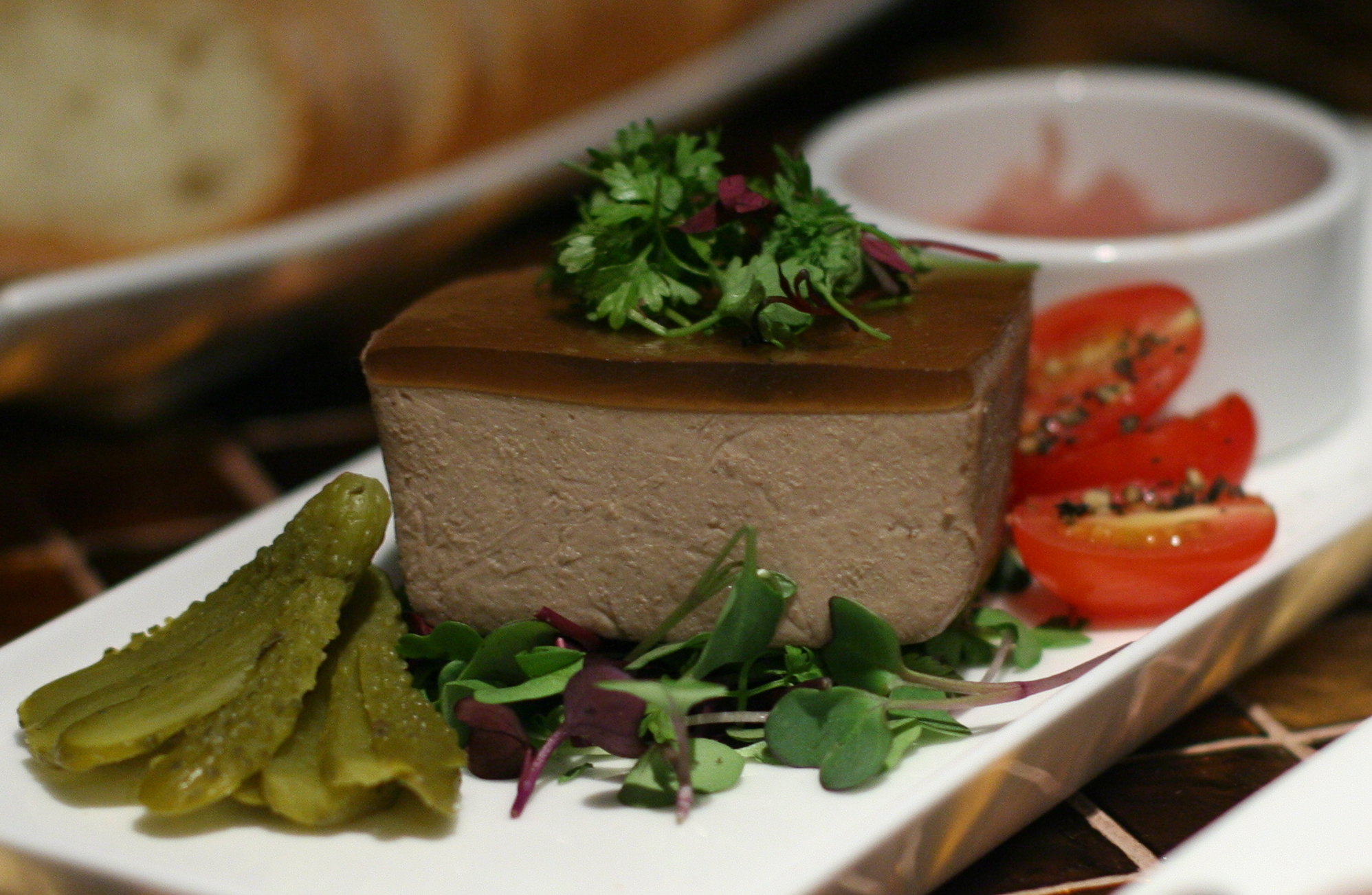
Duck liver pâté

== Red vs white meat ==
In the context of nutrition, red meat is defined as meat obtained from mammals, including beef, pork, lamb, mutton, veal, venison, and goat. Red meat does not necessarily appear red in color. Studies on the long-term health effects of meat often use the term white meat for poultry, including chicken and turkey. Some sources use the term white meat for both poultry and fish, and others exclude fish.

In culinary contexts, the term white meat is often used more narrowly to refer to only certain cuts of poultry, particularly the breast and wings. Chicken legs and thighs are referred to as dark meat in these contexts.

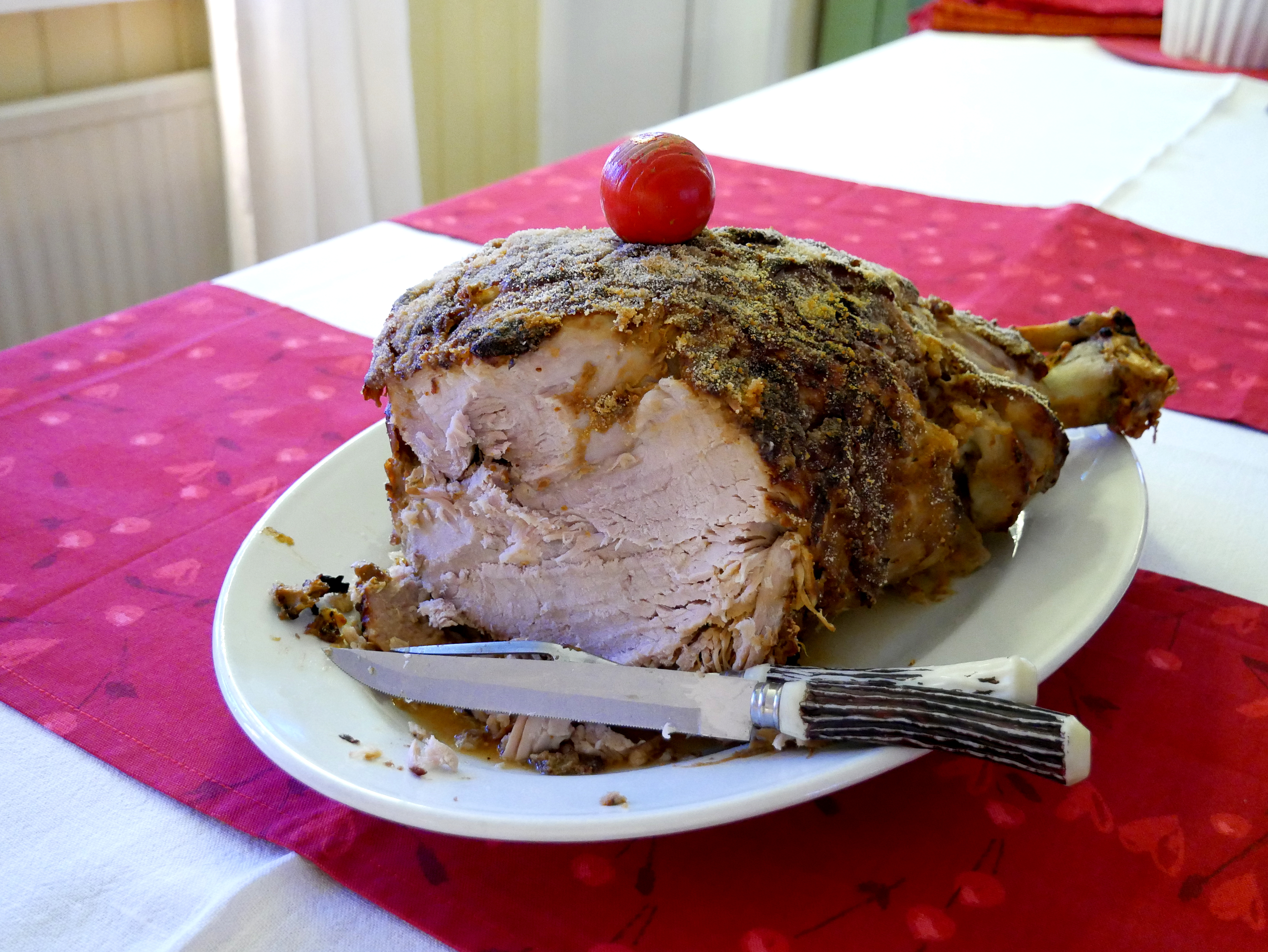
Pork is a type of red meat even though it can appear white or pink.

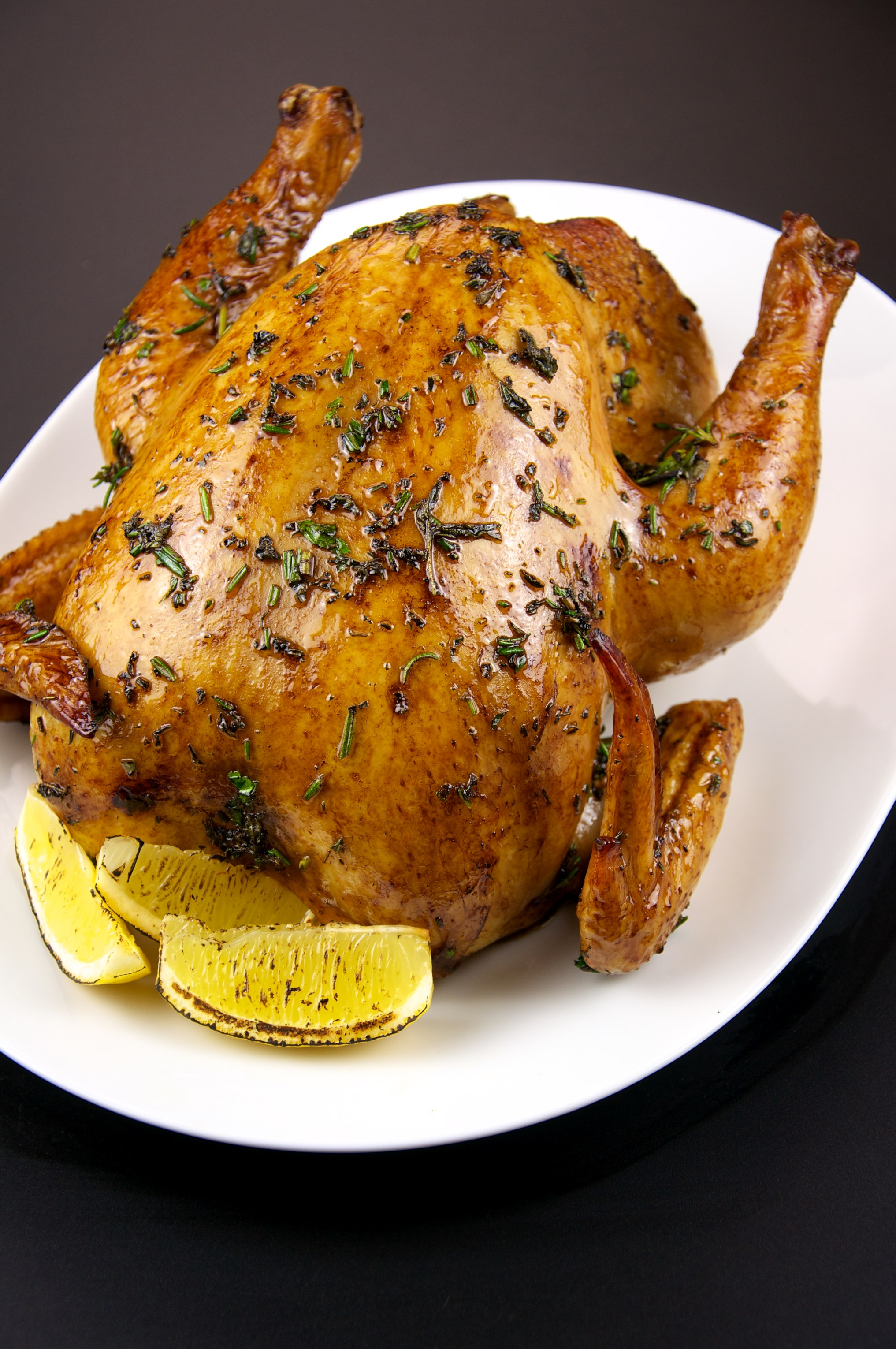
Nutritional studies often consider all chicken meat to be white meat.

== Health effects ==
Meat, in particular red and processed meat, is linked to a variety of health risks. The 2015–2020 Dietary Guidelines for Americans asked men and teenage boys to increase their consumption of vegetables or other underconsumed foods (fruits, whole grains, and dairy) while reducing intake of protein foods (meats, poultry, and eggs) that they currently overconsume.

=== Contamination ===
Toxic compounds including heavy metals, mycotoxins, pesticide residues, dioxins, polychlorinated biphenyl can contaminate meat. Processed, smoked and cooked meat may contain carcinogens such as polycyclic aromatic hydrocarbons. Toxins may be introduced to meat as part of animal feed, as veterinary drug residues, or during processing and cooking. Such compounds are often metabolized in the body to form harmful by-products. Negative effects depend on the individual genome, diet, and history of the consumer.

=== Cancer ===
The consumption of processed and red meat carries an increased risk of cancer. The International Agency for Research on Cancer (IARC), a specialized agency of the World Health Organization (WHO), classified processed meat (e.g., bacon, ham, hot dogs, sausages) as, "carcinogenic to humans (Group 1), based on sufficient evidence in humans that the consumption of processed meat causes colorectal cancer." IARC classified red meat as "probably carcinogenic to humans (Group 2A), based on limited evidence that the consumption of red meat causes cancer in humans and strong mechanistic evidence supporting a carcinogenic effect."

Cancer Research UK, National Health Service (NHS) and the National Cancer Institute have stated that red and processed meat intake increases risk of bowel cancer. The American Cancer Society in their "Diet and Physical Activity Guideline", stated "evidence that red and processed meats increase cancer risk has existed for decades, and many health organizations recommend limiting or avoiding these foods." The Canadian Cancer Society have stated that "eating red and processed meat increases cancer risk". A 2021 review found an increase of 11–51% risk of multiple cancer per 100g/d increment of red meat, and an increase of 8–72% risk of multiple cancer per 50g/d increment of processed meat.

Highly carcinogenic nitrosamines are commonly found in processed meat products. Nitrosamines are also formed in the gut when heme iron is consumed; red meat is rich in heme iron. Heterocyclic amines (HCAs) and polycyclic aromatic hydrocarbons (PAHs) are chemicals formed when muscle meat, including beef, pork, fish, or poultry, is cooked using high-temperature methods, such as pan frying or grilling directly over an open flame. In laboratory experiments, HCAs and PAHs have been found to be mutagenic—that is, they cause changes in DNA that may increase the risk of cancer. Microwaving meat before finishing cooking may reduce HCAs significantly.

=== Bacterial contamination ===
Bacterial contamination has been seen with meat products. A 2011 study by the Translational Genomics Research Institute showed that nearly half (47%) of the meat and poultry in U.S. grocery stores were contaminated with S. aureus, with more than half (52%) of those bacteria resistant to antibiotics. A 2018 investigation by the Bureau of Investigative Journalism and The Guardian found that around 15 percent of the US population suffers from foodborne illnesses every year. The investigation highlighted unsanitary conditions in US-based meat plants, which included meat products covered in excrement and abscesses "filled with pus". Complete cooking and the careful avoidance of recontamination reduce the risk of bacterial infections from meat.

=== Diabetes ===
A 2022 umbrella review found that each 100 g of red meat consumed per day is associated with a 17% higher risk of type 2 diabetes. Each 50 g of processed meat is associated with a 37% higher risk of type 2 diabetes. Diabetes UK advises people to limit their intake of red and processed meat.

=== Infectious diseases ===
Meat production and trade substantially increase risks for infectious diseases (zoonosis), including of pandemics, whether though contact with wild and farmed animals, or via husbandry's environmental impact. For example, avian influenza from poultry meat production is a threat to human health. Furthermore, the use of antibiotics in meat production contributes to antimicrobial resistance – which contributes to millions of deaths – and makes it harder to control infectious diseases.

=== Changes in consumer behavior ===
In response to changing meat prices as well as health concerns about saturated fat and cholesterol, consumers have altered their consumption of various meats. Consumption of beef in the United States between 1970 and 1974 and 1990–1994 dropped by 21%, while consumption of chicken increased by 90%.

=== Cardiovascular disease ===
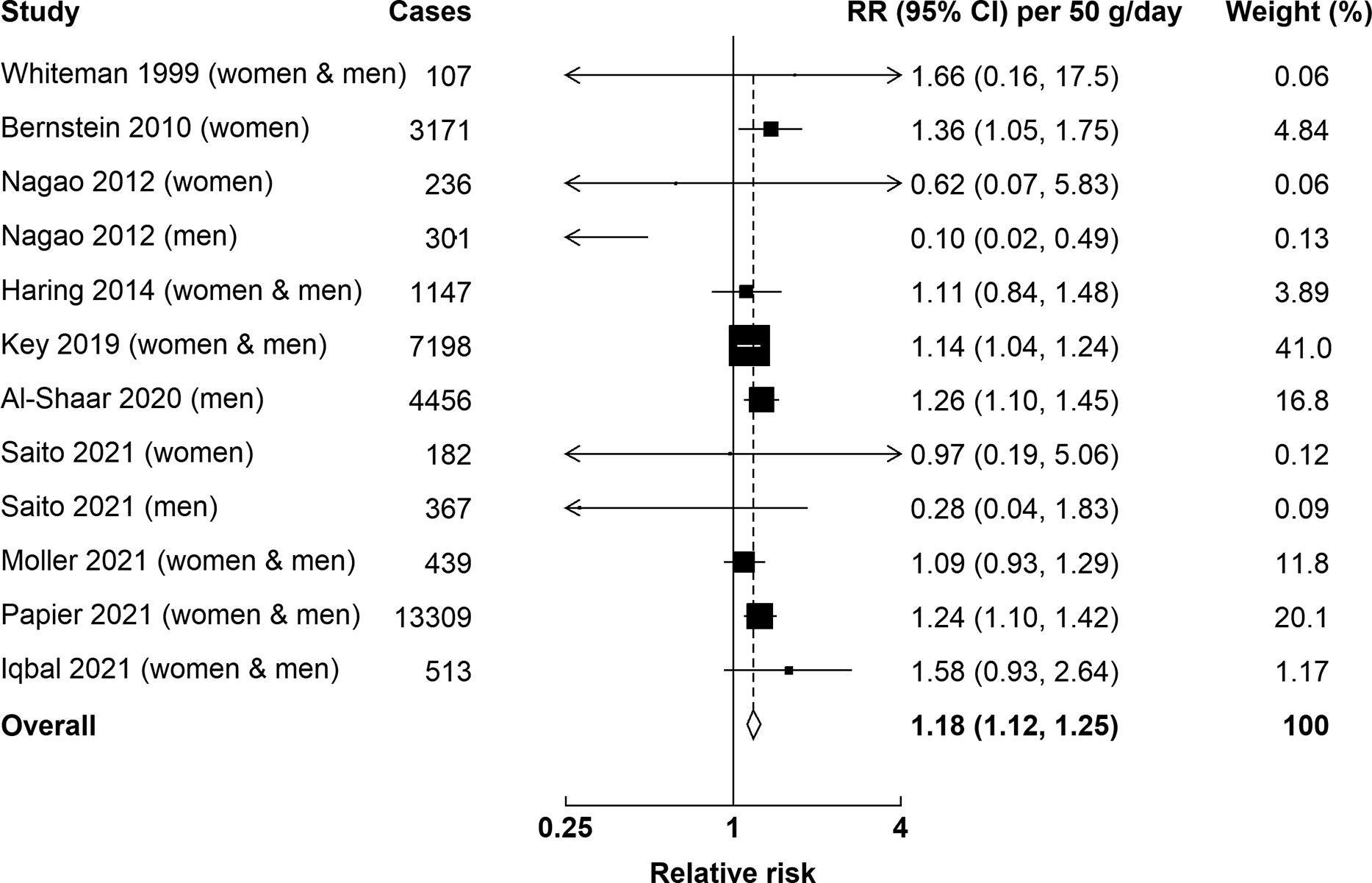
Risk of ischemic heart disease for each 50 g per day increase in processed meat consumption

A 2022 umbrella review found that each 100 g of red meat consumed per day is associated with a15 % higher risk of coronary heart disease, 14 % higher risk of hypertension, and 12% higher risk of stroke. Each 50 g of processed meat consumed per day is associated with a 27% higher risk of coronary heart disease, 17% higher risk of stroke, 8% higher risk of heart failure, and 15% higher risk of all-cause mortality.

== Environmental impact ==
A multitude of serious negative environmental effects are associated with meat production. Among these are greenhouse gas emissions, fossil energy use, water use, water quality changes, and effects on grazed ecosystems. They are so significant that according to University of Oxford researchers, "a vegan diet is probably the single biggest way to reduce your impact on planet Earth... far bigger than cutting down on your flights or buying an electric car". However, this is often ignored in the public consciousness and in plans to tackle serious environmental issues such as the climate crisis.

The livestock sector may be the largest source of water pollution (due to animal wastes, fertilizers, pesticides), and it contributes to emergence of antibiotic resistance. It accounts for over 8% of global human water use. It is a significant driver of biodiversity loss and ecosystems, as it causes deforestation, ocean dead zones, species extinction, land degradation, pollution, overfishing and global warming. Cattle farming was estimated to be responsible for 80 per cent of Amazon deforestation in 2008 due to the clearing of forests to grow animal feed (especially soya) and cattle ranching.

Environmental effects vary among livestock production systems. Grazing of livestock can be beneficial for some wildlife species, but not for others. Targeted grazing of livestock is used as a food-producing alternative to herbicide use in some vegetation management.

=== Land use ===
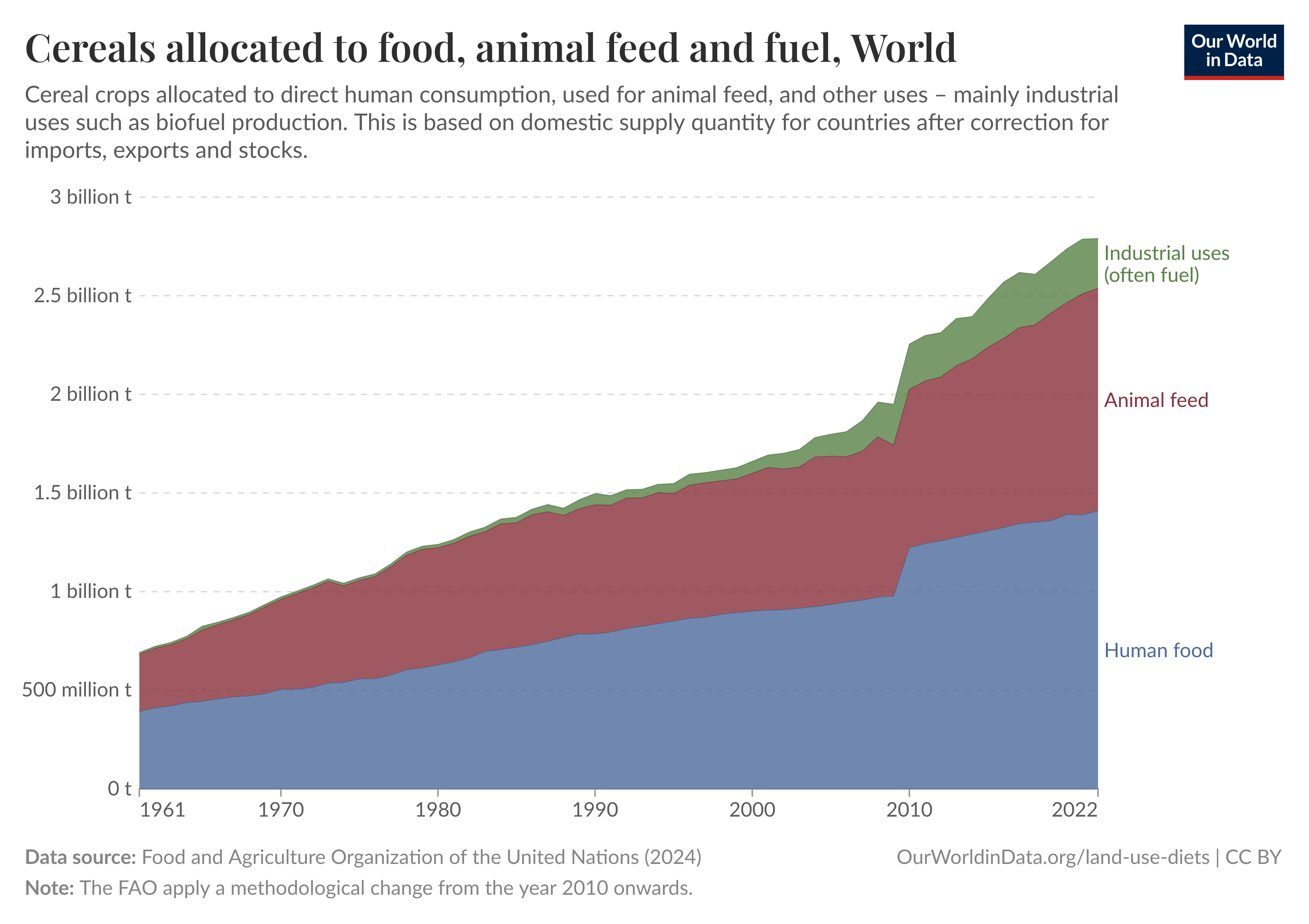
Cereal-use statistic showing an estimated large fraction of crops used as animal feed (red)

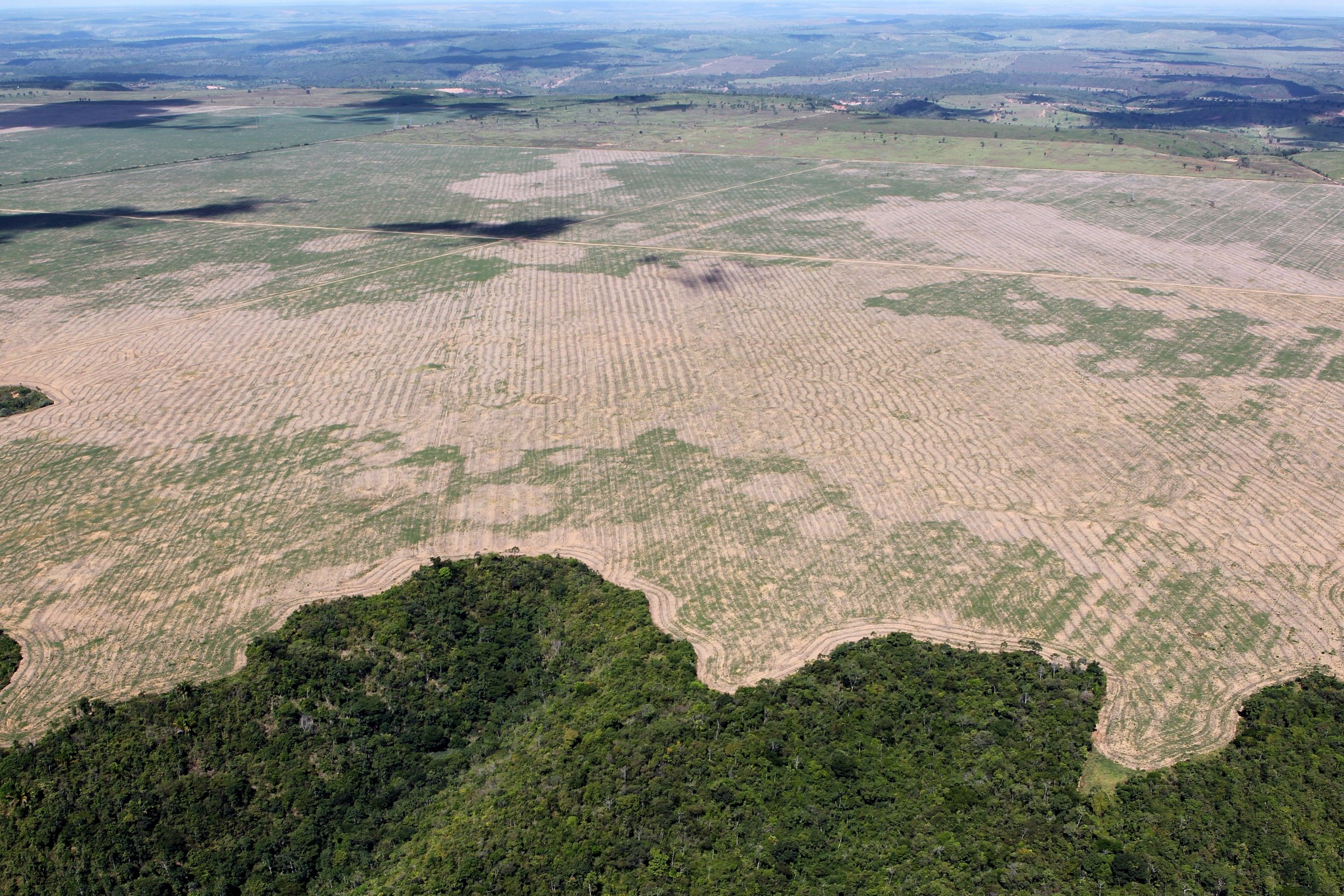
Meat production is a main driver of tropical deforestation, in the Amazon largely due to beef production for export.

Meat production is by far the biggest user of land, as it accounts for nearly 40% of the global land surface. Just in the contiguous United States, 34% of its land area (265 million hectares or 654 million acres) are used as pasture and rangeland, mostly feeding livestock, not counting 158 million hectares (391 million acres) of cropland (20%), some of which is used for producing feed for livestock. Roughly 75% of deforested land around the globe is used for livestock pasture. Deforestation from practices like slash-and-burn releases CO_{2} and removes the carbon sink of grown tropical forest ecosystems which substantially mitigate climate change. Land use is a major pressure on pressure on fertile soils which is important for global food security.

=== Climate change ===
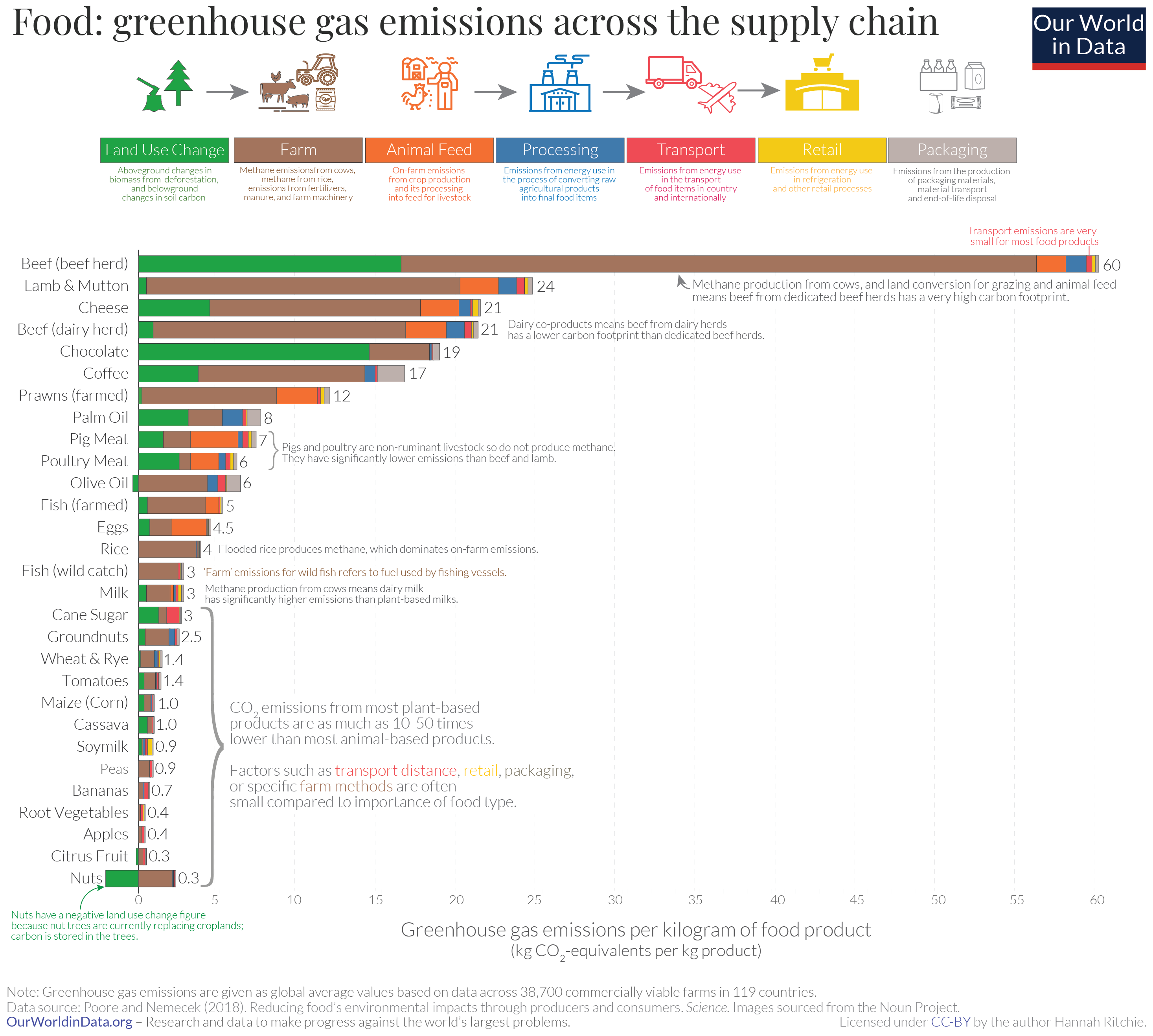
Life-cycle assessment of GHG emissions for foods. Beef is the food with the largest carbon footprint, mainly due to methane production from cows.

The rising global consumption of carbon-intensive meat products has "exploded the global carbon footprint of agriculture," according to some top scientists. Meat, dairy, and egg production are responsible for 57% of the greenhouse gases attributable to food production, and 20% of all greenhouse gas emissions.

Some nations show very different impacts to counterparts within the same group, with Brazil and Australia having emissions over 200% higher than the average of their respective income groups, driven by meat consumption.

According to the Assessing the Environmental Impacts of Consumption and Production report produced by United Nations Environment Programme's (UNEP) international panel for sustainable resource management, a worldwide transition in the direction of a meat and dairy free diet is indispensable if adverse global climate change were to be prevented. A 2019 report in The Lancet recommended that global meat (and sugar) consumption be reduced by 50 percent to mitigate climate change. Meat consumption in Western societies needs to be reduced by up to 90% according to a 2018 study published in Nature. The 2019 special report by the Intergovernmental Panel on Climate Change called for significantly reducing meat consumption, particularly in wealthy countries, in order to mitigate and adapt to climate change.

=== Biodiversity loss ===
Meat consumption is a primary contributor to the sixth mass extinction. A 2017 study by the World Wildlife Fund found that 60% of global biodiversity loss is attributable to meat-based diets, in particular from the use of land for feed crops, resulting in large-scale loss of habitats and species. Livestock make up 60% of the biomass of all mammals on earth, followed by humans (36%) and wild mammals (4%). In November 2017, 15,364 world scientists signed a Warning to Humanity calling for a drastic reduction in per capita consumption of meat and "dietary shifts towards mostly plant-based foods". The 2019 Global Assessment Report on Biodiversity and Ecosystem Services recommended a reduction in meat consumption to mitigate biodiversity loss. A 2021 Chatham House report asserted that a shift towards plant-based diets would free up land for the restoration of ecosystems and biodiversity.

Meat consumption is predicted to rise as the human population increases and becomes more affluent; this in turn would increase greenhouse gas emissions and further reduce biodiversity.

=== Reducing environmental impact ===
The environmental impact of meat production can be reduced on the farm by conversion of human-inedible residues of food crops. Manure from meat-producing livestock is used as fertilizer. Substitution of animal manures for synthetic fertilizers in crop production can be environmentally significant, as between 43 and 88 MJ of fossil fuel energy are used per kg of nitrogen in manufacture of synthetic nitrogenous fertilizers.

=== Reducing meat consumption ===
The IPCC and others have stated that meat production has to be reduced substantially for any sufficient mitigation of climate change and, at least initially, largely through shifts towards plant-based diets where meat consumption is high. Meat can be replaced by, for example, high-protein iron-rich low-emission legumes and common fungi, dietary supplements (e.g. of vitamin B_{12}) and fortified foods, cultured meat, microbial foods, mycoprotein, meat substitutes, and other alternatives, such as those based on mushrooms, legumes (pulses), and other food sources. Land previously used for meat production can be rewilded. The biologists Rodolfo Dirzo, Gerardo Ceballos, and Paul R. Ehrlich state that it is the "massive planetary monopoly of industrial meat production that needs to be curbed" while respecting the cultural traditions of indigenous peoples, for whom meat is an important source of protein.

== Cultural aspects ==
Meat is part of the human diet in most cultures, where it often has symbolic meaning and important social functions. Some people choose not to eat meat (vegetarianism) or any food made from animals (veganism). The reasons for not eating all or some meat may include ethical objections to killing animals for food, health concerns, environmental concerns or religious dietary laws.

=== Ethical issues ===
Ethical issues regarding the consumption of meat include objecting to the act of killing animals or to the agricultural practices used in meat production. Reasons for objecting to killing animals for consumption may include animal rights, environmental ethics, or an aversion to inflicting pain or harm on sentient animals. Some people, while not vegetarians, refuse to eat the flesh of certain animals for cultural or religious reasons.

The founders of Western philosophy disagreed about the ethics of eating meat. Plato's Republic has Socrates describe the ideal state as vegetarian. Pythagoras believed that humans and animals were equal and therefore disapproved of meat consumption, as did Plutarch, whereas Zeno and Epicurus were vegetarian but allowed meat-eating in their philosophy. Conversely, Aristotle's Politics assert that animals, as inferior beings, exist to serve humans, including as food. Augustine drew on Aristotle to argue that the universe's natural hierarchy allows humans to eat animals, and animals to eat plants. Enlightenment philosophers were likewise divided. Descartes wrote that animals were merely animated machines, while Kant considered them inferior beings for lack of discernment: means rather than ends. But Voltaire and Rousseau disagreed; Rousseau argued that meat-eating is a social rather than a natural act, because children are not interested in meat.

Later philosophers examined the changing practices of eating meat in the modern age as part of a process of detachment from animals as living beings. Norbert Elias, for instance, noted that in medieval times cooked animals were brought to the table whole, but that since the Renaissance only the edible parts are served, which are no longer recognizably part of an animal. Modern eaters, according to Noëlie Vialles, demand an "ellipsis" between meat and dead animals. Fernand Braudel wrote that since the European diet of the 15th and 16th century was particularly heavy in meat, European colonialism helped export meat-eating across the globe, as colonized peoples took up the culinary habits of their colonizers.

=== Religious traditions ===
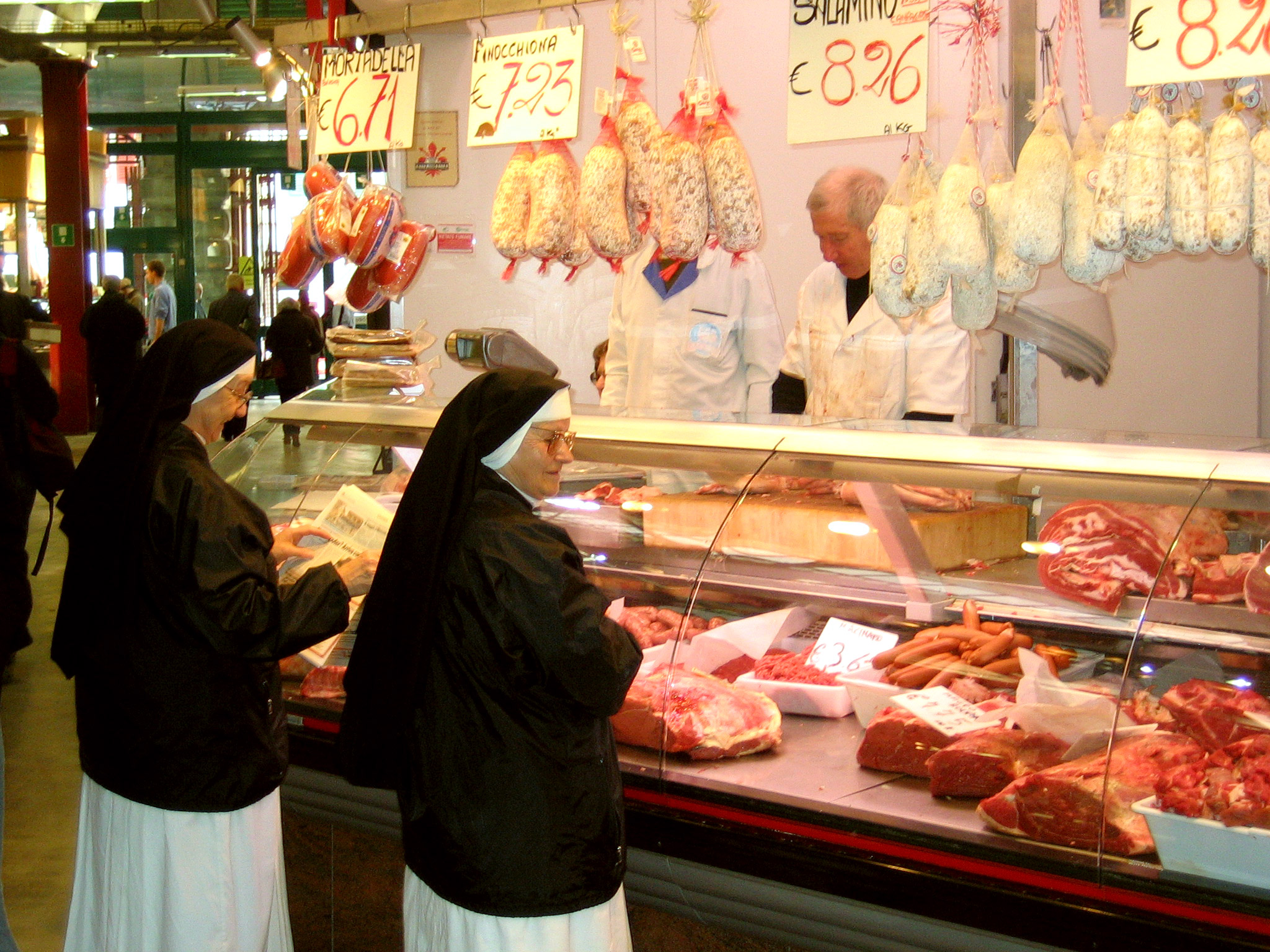
Catholic nuns buying meat in Italy

Among the Indian religions, Jainism opposes the eating of meat, while some schools of Buddhism and Hinduism advocate but do not mandate vegetarianism. Some Sikh groups oppose eating any meat. Jewish Kashrut dietary rules allow certain (kosher) meat and forbid other (treif) meat. Similar rules apply in Islamic dietary laws: The Quran explicitly forbids meat from animals that die naturally, blood, and the meat of pigs, which are haram, forbidden, as opposed to halal, allowed.

=== Psychology ===
Research in applied psychology has investigated meat eating in relation to morality, emotions, cognition, and personality. Psychological research suggests meat eating is correlated with masculinity, and reduced openness to experience. Research into the consumer psychology of meat is relevant both to meat industry marketing and to those advocating eating less meat.

=== Gender ===
Unlike most other foods, meat is not perceived as gender-neutral; it is associated with men and masculinity. Sociological research, ranging from African tribal societies to contemporary barbecue, indicates that men are much more likely to participate in preparing meat than other food. This has been attributed to the influence of traditional male gender roles, in view of what Jack Goody calls a "male familiarity with killing", or as Claude Lévi-Strauss suggests, that roasting (meat) is more violent than boiling (grains and vegetables). In modern societies, men tend to consume more meat than women, and men often prefer red meat whereas women tend to prefer chicken and fish.

== See also ==
- Bushmeat
- Culinary name
- Cartilage (also called gristle)
- List of meat dishes
- Meat on the bone
- Meat-free days
- Mechanically separated meat
- Mystery meat

== Sources ==
This article incorporates text from a free content work. Licensed under CC BY-SA IGO 3.0 (license statement/permission). Text taken from World Food and Agriculture – Statistical Yearbook 2023, FAO, FAO.

This article incorporates text from a free content work. Licensed under CC BY 4.0 (license statement/permission). Text taken from World Food and Agriculture – Statistical Yearbook 2025, Food and Agriculture Organization of the United Nations.

- Lawrie, R.A.; Ledward, D. A. (2006). Lawrie's meat science (7th ed.). Cambridge: Woodhead Publishing. ISBN 978-1-84569-159-2.
