= Assessing the Environmental Impacts of Consumption and Production =

Organization

- Type: Independent scientific assessment
- Publication: June 2010, International Resource Panel
- Website: www.resourcepanel.org

Assessing the Environmental Impacts of Consumption and Production: Priority Products and Materials is a scientific assessment published in 2010 by the International Resource Panel (IRP) of the United Nations Environment Programme (UNEP). The report assessed the environmental impact of several activities, including food production.

== Summary ==
The report assessed the impact of economic activities on the environment. It identified that the most critical impacts are related to ecosystem health, human health and resource depletion. From a combined production, consumption and materials perspective, the authors found that the production of food and all processes involving fossil fuels had the greatest impacts. Animal products caused more damage than producing construction minerals such as sand or cement, plastics or metals. Currently, more than half the world's crops are used to feed animals. In America, more than one-third of the fossil fuels produced are used to raise animals for food.

The authors explained that Western dietary preferences for meat would be unsustainable as the world population rose to the forecast 9.1 billion by 2050. Demand for meat is expected to double by this date; meat consumption is steadily rising in countries such as China that once followed more sustainable, vegetable-based diets. According to the report: "Impacts from agriculture are expected to increase substantially due to population growth, increasing consumption of animal products. Unlike fossil fuels, it is difficult to look for alternatives: people have to eat. A substantial reduction of impacts would only be possible with a substantial worldwide diet change, away from animal products."

== Role of the IRP ==
The IRP provides independent scientific assessments and expert advice on a variety of areas, including:

- The volume of selected raw material reserves and how efficiently these resources are being used
- The lifecycle-long environmental impacts of products and services created and consumed around the globe
- options to meet human and economic needs with fewer or cleaner resources.
