= Facioscapulohumeral muscular dystrophy =

Muscular degenerative disease of the face, shoulder blades, and upper arms

- Other names: Landouzy–Dejerine muscular dystrophy, FSHMD, FSH
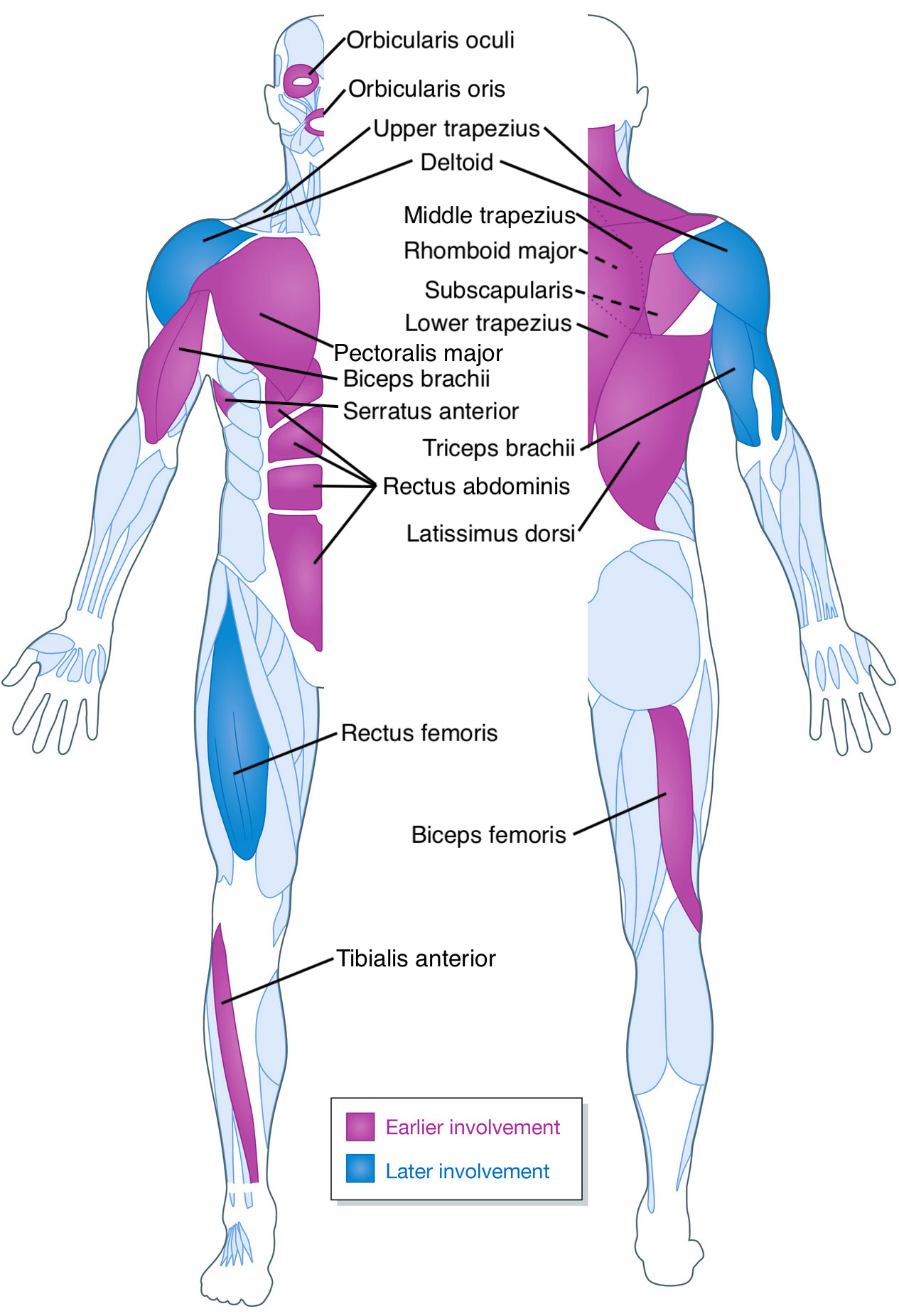
- A diagram showing the muscles commonly affected by FSHD
- Pronunciation: /ˌfeɪʃiːoʊˌskæpjəloʊˈhjuːmərəl/ fay-shee-oh-skap-yə-low-HEW-mər-əl; alt. /feɪs-, fɑːʃ-, fɑːs-/
- Specialty: Neurology, neuromuscular medicine
- Symptoms: Facial weakness, scapular winging, foot drop
- Complications: Chronic pain, dry eyes, and shoulder instability; less commonly retinal disease, scoliosis, and respiratory insufficiency
- Usual onset: Late teens to early adulthood; early childhood in severe cases
- Duration: Lifelong
- Types: FSHD1 (D4Z4 contraction) and FSHD2 (D4Z4 hypomethylation), genetic subtypes of a single spectrum disorder
- Causes: Genetic (inherited or new mutation)
- Risk factors: Male sex, extent of genetic mutation
- Diagnostic method: Genetic testing
- Differential diagnosis: Limb-girdle muscular dystrophy (especially calpainopathy), Pompe disease, mitochondrial myopathy, polymyositis
- Management: Physical therapy, bracing, reconstructive surgery
- Medication: Clinical trials ongoing
- Prognosis: Progressive and highly variable; severe cases can shorten life expectancy
- Frequency: Up to 1/8,333

Facioscapulohumeral muscular dystrophy (FSHD) is a type of muscular dystrophy, a group of heritable diseases that cause degeneration of muscle and progressive weakness. Per the name, FSHD tends to sequentially weaken the muscles of the face, those that position the scapula, and those overlying the humerus bone of the upper arm. These areas can be spared. Muscles of other areas usually are affected, especially those of the chest, abdomen, spine, and shin. Most skeletal muscle can be affected in advanced disease. Abnormally positioned, termed 'winged', scapulas are common, as is the inability to lift the foot, known as foot drop. The two sides of the body are often affected unequally. Weakness typically manifests at ages 15–30 years. FSHD can also cause hearing loss and blood vessel abnormalities at the back of the eye.

FSHD is caused by a genetic mutation leading to deregulation of the DUX4 gene. Normally, DUX4 is expressed (i.e., turned on) only in select human tissues, most notably in the very young embryo. In the remaining tissues, it is repressed (i.e., turned off). In FSHD, this repression fails in muscle tissue, allowing sporadic expression of DUX4 throughout life. Deletion of DNA in the region surrounding DUX4 is the causative mutation in 95% of cases, termed "D4Z4 contraction" and defining FSHD type 1 (FSHD1). FSHD caused by other mutations is FSHD type 2 (FSHD2). To develop the disease, a 4qA allele is also required, and is a common variation in the DNA next to DUX4. The chances of a D4Z4 contraction with a 4qA allele being passed on to a child are 50% (autosomal dominant); in 30% of cases, the mutation arose spontaneously. Mutations of FSHD cause inadequate DUX4 repression by unpacking the DNA around DUX4, making it accessible to be copied into messenger RNA (mRNA). The 4qA allele stabilizes this DUX4 mRNA, allowing it to be used for production of DUX4 protein. DUX4 protein is a modulator of hundreds of other genes, many of which are involved in muscle function. How this genetic modulation causes muscle damage remains unclear.

Signs, symptoms, and diagnostic tests can suggest FSHD; genetic testing usually provides a definitive diagnosis. FSHD can be presumptively diagnosed in an individual with signs/symptoms and an established family history. No intervention has proven effective in slowing the progression of weakness. Screening allows for early detection and intervention for various disease complications. Symptoms can be addressed with physical therapy, bracing, and reconstructive surgery such as surgical fixation of the scapula to the thorax. FSHD affects up to 1 in 8,333 people, putting it in the three most common muscular dystrophies with myotonic dystrophy and Duchenne muscular dystrophy. Prognosis is variable. Many are not significantly limited in daily activity, whereas a wheelchair or scooter is required in 20% of cases. Life expectancy is typically not affected; death can rarely be attributed to respiratory insufficiency due to FSHD.

FSHD was first distinguished as a disease in the 1870s and 1880s when French physicians Louis Théophile Joseph Landouzy and Joseph Jules Dejerine followed a family affected by it, thus the initial name Landouzy–Dejerine muscular dystrophy. Descriptions of probable individual FSHD cases predate their work. The significance of D4Z4 contraction on chromosome 4 was established in the 1990s. The DUX4 gene was discovered in 1999, found to be expressed and toxic in 2007, and in 2010, the genetic mechanism causing its expression was elucidated. In 2012, the gene most frequently mutated in FSHD2 was identified. In 2019, the first drug designed to counteract DUX4 expression entered clinical trials.

== Signs and symptoms ==
Classically, weakness develops in the face, then the shoulder girdle, then the upper arm. These muscles can be spared, and other muscles usually are affected. The order of muscle involvement can cause the appearance of weakness, "descending" from the face to the legs. The distribution and degree of muscle weakness are extremely variable, even between identical twins. Musculoskeletal pain is very common, most often described in the neck, shoulders, lower back, and the back of the knee. Fatigue is also common. Muscle weakness usually becomes noticeable on one side of the body before the other, a disease hallmark. The right shoulder and arm muscles are more often affected than the left upper extremity muscles, independent of handedness. Otherwise, neither side of the body is at more risk. Classically, symptoms appear in those 15–30 years old, although adult-onset can also occur. Infantile-onset (also called early-onset), defined as onset before age 10, occurs in 10% of affected individuals. FSHD1 with a substantial D4Z4 deletion (EcoRI 10-11 kb) is more strongly associated with infantile-onset and severe weakness. Absence or near absence of symptoms is not uncommon, approaching up to 30% of mutation-carrying individuals in select FSHD1 families. On average, FSHD2 presents 10 years later than FSHD1. Otherwise, FSHD1 and FSHD2 are indistinguishable on the basis of weakness. Disease progression is slow, and long static phases, in which no progression is apparent, are not uncommon. Less commonly, individual muscles rapidly deteriorate over several months. The symptom burden of FSHD is typically more severe than it is perceived to be by those without the disease.

=== Face ===
Weakness of the muscles of the face is the most distinguishing sign of FSHD. It is typically the earliest sign, although it is rarely the initial complaint. At least mild facial weakness can be found in 90% or more with FSHD. One of the most common deficits is inability to close the eyelids, which can result in sleeping with the eyelids open and dry eyes. The implicated muscle is the orbicularis oculi muscle. Another common deficit is an inability to purse the lips, causing an inability to pucker, whistle, or blow up a balloon. The implicated muscle is the orbicularis oris muscle. A third common deficit is the inability to raise the corners of the mouth, causing a "horizontal smile," which looks more like a grin. Responsible is the zygomaticus major muscle.

Weakness of facial muscles contributes to difficulty pronouncing words. Facial expressions can appear diminished, arrogant, grumpy, or fatigued. Muscles used for chewing and moving the eyes are not affected. Difficulty swallowing is not typical, although it can occur in advanced cases, which is at least in part due to facial muscle weakness. FSHD is generally progressive, but it is not established whether facial weakness is progressive or stable throughout life.

=== Shoulder, chest, and arm ===
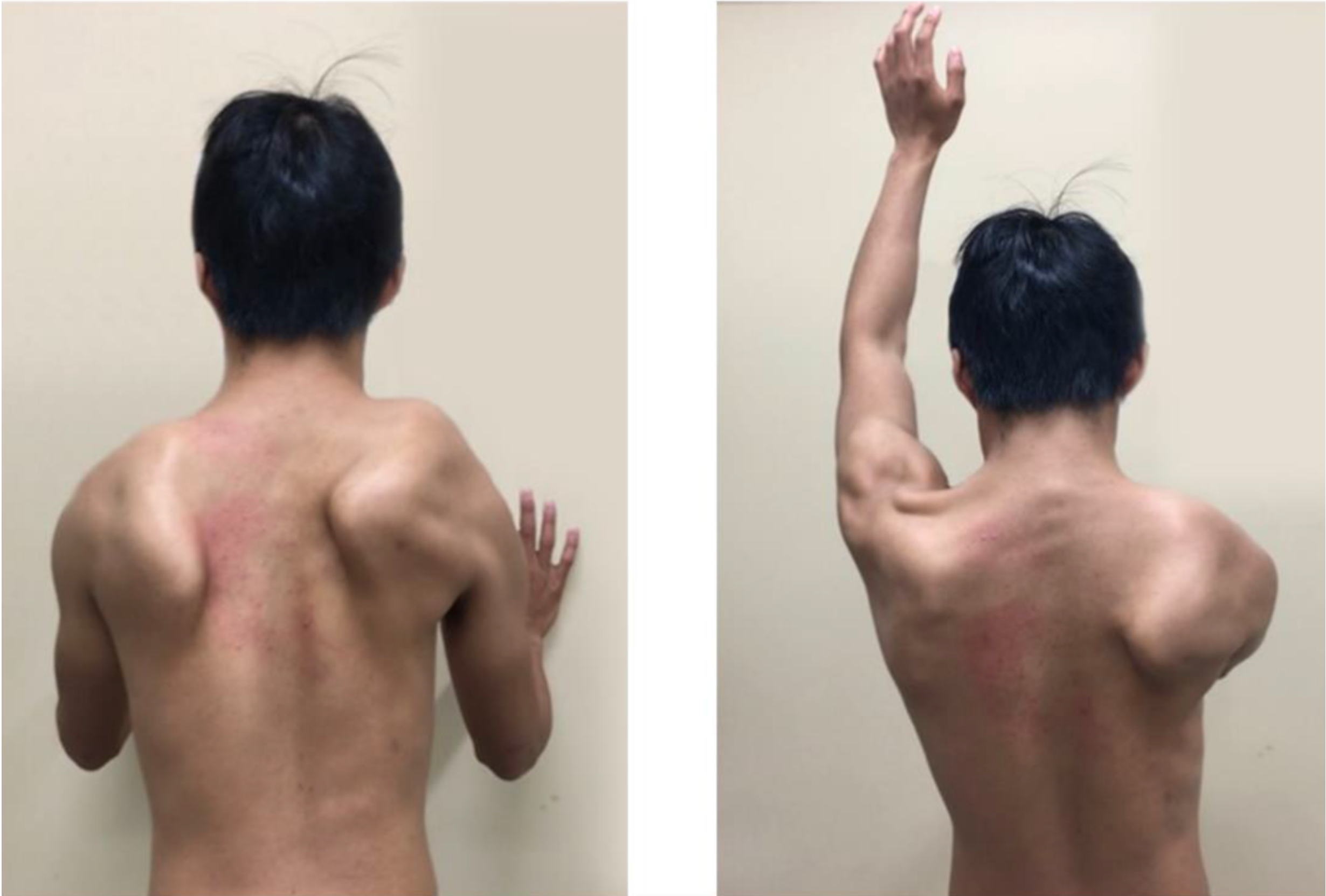
Bilateral scapular winging, right moreso than left. The left image shows the wall push test, the right image shows attempted shoulder flexion.

After the facial weakness, weakness usually develops in the muscles of the chest and those that span from the scapula to the thorax. Symptoms involving the shoulder, such as difficulty working with the arms overhead, are the initial complaint in 80% of cases. Predominantly, the serratus anterior and middle and lower trapezii muscles are affected; the upper trapezius is often spared. Trapezius weakness causes the scapulas to become downwardly rotated and protracted, resulting in winged scapulas, horizontal clavicles, and sloping shoulders; arm abduction is impaired. Serratus anterior weakness impairs arm flexion, and worsening of winging can be demonstrated when pushing against a wall. Muscles spanning from the scapula to the arm are generally spared, which include the deltoid and the rotator cuff muscles. The deltoid can be affected later on, especially the upper portion.

Severe muscle wasting can make bones and spared shoulder muscles very visible, a characteristic example being the "poly-hill" sign elicited by arm elevation. The first "hill" or bump is the upper corner of scapula appearing to "herniate" up and over the rib cage. The second hill is the AC joint, seen between a wasted upper trapezius and wasted upper deltoid. The third hill is the lower deltoid, distinguishable from the wasted upper deltoid and wasted humeral muscles. Shoulder weakness and pain can, in turn, lead to shoulder instability, such as recurrent dislocation, subluxation, or downward translation of the humeral head.

Also affected is the chest, particularly the parts of the pectoralis major muscle that connect to the sternum and ribs. The part that connects to the clavicle is less often affected. This muscle-wasting pattern can contribute to a prominent horizontal anterior axillary fold. Beyond this point, the disease does not progress further in 30% of familial cases. After upper torso weakness, weakness can "descend" to the upper arms (biceps muscle and, particularly, the triceps muscle). The forearms are usually spared, resulting in an appearance some compare to the fictional character Popeye. When the forearms are affected in advanced disease, the wrist extensors are more often affected.

=== Lower body and trunk ===
After the upper body, weakness can next appear in either the pelvis or it "skips" the pelvis and involves the tibialis anterior (shin muscle), causing foot drop. One author considers the pelvic and thigh muscles the last group affected. Pelvic weakness can manifest as a Trendelenburg's sign. Weakness of the back of the thigh (hamstrings) is more common than weakness of the front of the thigh (quadriceps). In more severe cases, especially infantile FSHD, there can be anterior pelvic tilt, with associated hyperextension of the knees.

Weakness can also occur in the abdominal muscles and paraspinal muscles, which can manifest as a protuberant abdomen and lumbar hyperlordosis. Abdominal weakness can cause inability to do a sit-up or the inability to turn from one side to the other while lying on one's back. Of the rectus abdominis muscle, the lower portion is preferentially affected, manifesting as a positive Beevor's sign. In advanced cases, neck extensor weakness can cause the head to lean towards the chest, termed head drop.

=== Non-muscular ===
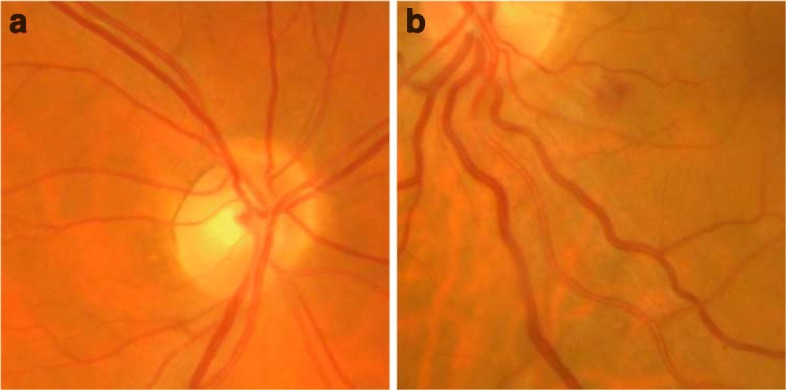
Funduscopy of the retina: (A) normal blood vessels (B) tortuous blood vessels, as often seen with FSHD

The most common non-musculoskeletal manifestation of FSHD is abnormalities in the small arteries (arterioles) in the retina. Tortuosity of the arterioles is seen in approximately 50% of those with FSHD. Less common arteriole abnormalities include telangiectasias and microaneurysms. These abnormalities of arterioles usually do not affect vision or health, although a severe form of it mimics Coat's disease, a condition found in about 1% of FSHD cases and more frequently associated with large 4q35 deletions. High-frequency sensorineural hearing loss can occur in those with large 4q35 deletions, but otherwise is no more common compared to the general population. Large 4q35 deletion can lead to various other rare manifestations.

Scoliosis can occur, thought to result from muscular weakness in the abdomen, hip extensors, and spine. Conversely, scoliosis can be viewed as a compensatory mechanism to weakness. Breathing can be affected, associated with kyphoscoliosis and wheelchair use; it is seen in one-third of wheelchair-using patients. However, ventilator support (nocturnal or diurnal) is needed in only 1% of cases. Although there are reports of increased risk of cardiac arrhythmias, the consensus is that the heart is unaffected.

== Genetics ==
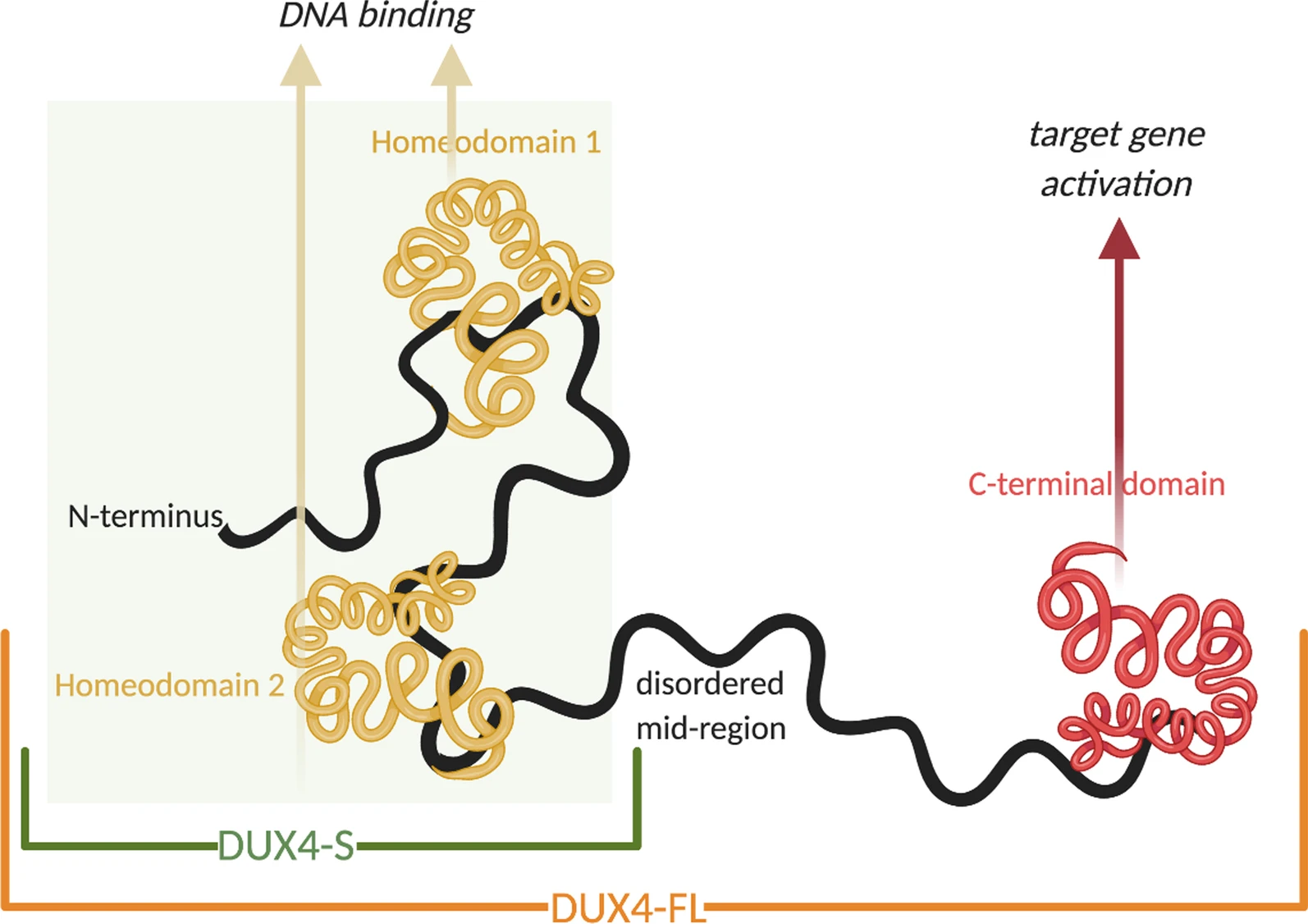
Structure of DUX4 protein full-length (FL), with short (S) version indicated

The genetics of FSHD are complex. FSHD and the myotonic dystrophies have unique genetic mechanisms that differ substantially from the rest of the genetic myopathies. The DUX4 gene is the focal point of FSHD genetics. Normally, full-length DUX4 protein (DUX4-fl) is expressed during early embryogenesis, in testicular tissue of adults, and the thymus; in all other tissues, it is repressed. In FSHD, however, this repression is lost due to hypomethylation and altered histone modification at 4q35, but even in FSHD the relaxation of D4Z4 chromatin remains incomplete: residual DNA methylation and repressive histone marks can persist on a subset of repeats, so DUX4 expression is stochastic, occurring as rare bursts that affect only a small minority of nuclei at any given time. Three-dimensional chromosome organisation further stabilises this silencing: D4Z4 arrays contact the nuclear lamina and engage in long-range subtelomeric interactions that maintain a compacted state; with fewer repeats these contacts are remodelled, so that only a fraction of myonuclei cross the threshold for DUX4 activation at any given time. Although this permissive genetic/epigenetic context is present in every somatic cell, derepression observed in patients occurs predominantly in muscle and its expression there remains rare: studies could detect DUX4 mRNA in only roughly one nucleus in 1000 of cultured FSHD cells, and the DUX4 protein in about one in 200 differentiated myonuclei. Despite this rarity, endogenous DUX4 expression is sufficient to act as a potent toxic factor within muscle fibres; how such rare stochastic events drive widespread disease is addressed in the Pathophysiology section. Several mutations can result in disease, upon which FSHD is sub-classified into FSHD type 1 (FSHD1) and FSHD type 2 (FSHD2). Disease can only result when a mutation is present in combination with select, commonly found variations of 4q35, termed haplotype polymorphisms, which are roughly dividable into the groups 4qA and 4qB. A 4qA haplotype polymorphism, often referred to as a 4qA allele, is necessary for disease, as it contains a polyadenylation sequence that allows DUX4 mRNA to resist degradation long enough to be translated into DUX4 protein.

=== DUX4 and the D4Z4 repeat array ===
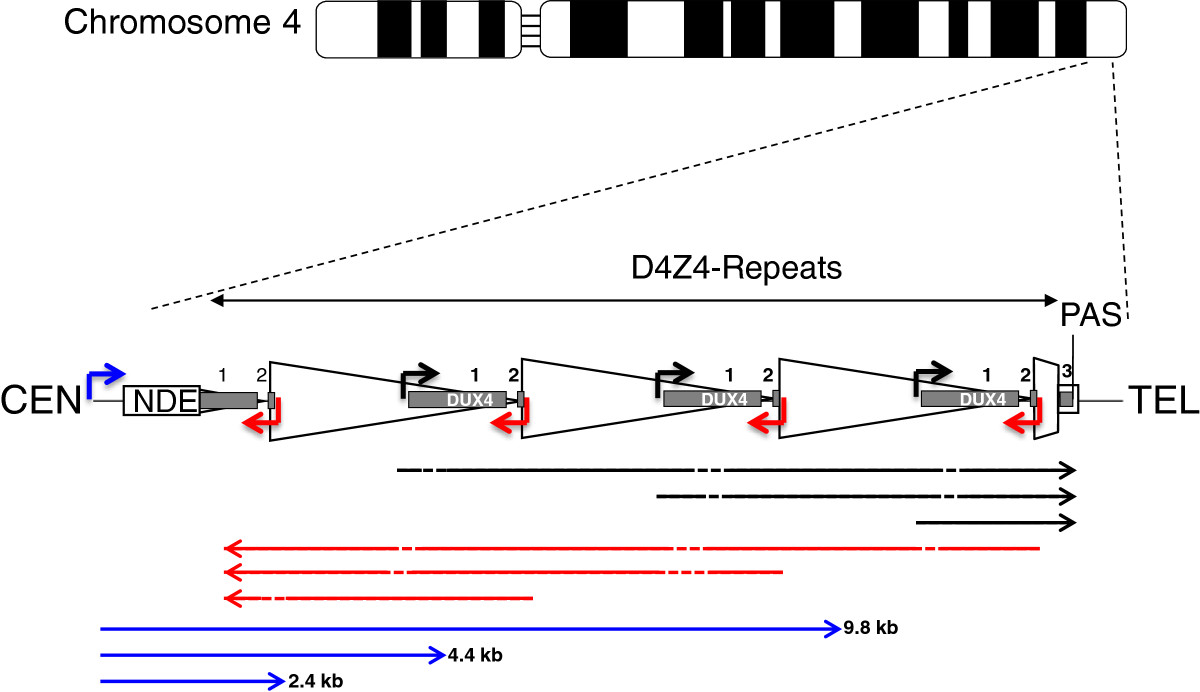
D4Z4 array with three D4Z4 repeats and the 4qA allele: CEN / centromeric end / TEL / telomeric end; NDE box / non-deleted element / PAS / polyadenylation site; triangle / D4Z4 repeat / trapezoid / partial D4Z4 repeat; white box / pLAM / gray boxes / DUX4 exons 1, 2, 3; arrows: corner / promoters / straight / RNA transcripts; black / sense / red / antisense; blue / DBE-T / dashes / dicing sites

DUX4 resides within the D4Z4 macrosatellite repeat array, which is a DNA sequence composed of a variable number of tandemly repeated large DNA segments (ie, repeats). The D4Z4 repeat array is located at the tip of the large arm of chromosome 4, abbreviated as '4q35'. Each D4Z4 repeat is 3.3 kilobase pairs (kb) long and is the site of epigenetic regulation, containing both heterochromatin and euchromatin structures. In FSHD, the heterochromatin structure is lost, becoming euchromatin, which consists of less methylation of DNA, and altered methylation of histones. Histone methylation patterns differ slightly between FSHD1 and FSHD2.

The subtelomeric region of chromosome 10q contains a tandem repeat structure highly homologous (99% identical) to 4q35, containing "D4Z4-like" repeats with protein-coding regions identical to DUX4 (D10Z10 repeats and DUX4L10, respectively). Because 10q usually lacks a polyadenylation sequence, it is usually not implicated in disease. However, chromosomal rearrangements can occur between 4q and 10q repeat arrays, and involvement in disease is possible if a 4q D4Z4 repeat and polyadenylation signal are transferred onto 10q, or if rearrangement causes FSHD1.

D4Z4 repeat array types are subclassified into 4qA and 4qB alleles, with only 4qA alleles causing disease. 4qA alleles are defined by a specific sequence of DNA immediately downstream to the D4Z4 repeat array: a 260 base pair region named pLAM, followed by a 6,200 base pair beta satellite region. 4qA and 4qB alleles, together, can be subdivided into at least 17 types, based on the DNA upstream from the D4Z4 repeat array, the presence/absence of restriction enzyme sites within D4Z4, the size of the last D4Z4 repeat element, and the DNA present downstream to the D4Z4 repeat array. For example, the most common 4qA allele, 4A161, has 161 nucleotides in the region upstream from the D4Z4 repeat array, and can, in turn, be subdivided into 4A161S and 4A161L (short and long), which are characterized by a flanking D4Z4 repeat units of 300 nucleotides and 1,900 nucleotides, respectively.

DUX4 consists of three exons. Exons 1 and 2 are in each repeat; only exon 1 encodes for the DUX4 protein. Exon 3 is in the pLAM region telomeric to the last partial repeat, and it can vary in length depending on the type of 4qA allele. A polyadenylation signal is within exon 3. Because exon 3 and its containing polyadenylation signal are not contained within each D4Z4 repeat, only the last D4Z4 repeat of a D4Z4 repeat array can encode a stable mRNA transcript to produce the DUX4 protein. These transcripts can be spliced in several ways to form mature RNA. One of these transcripts encodes only a portion of DUX4 protein, termed DUX4-s (DUX4-short). DUX4-s is found in low amounts in a variety of healthy tissues, including healthy muscle; its function is not entirely clear. The remaining transcript versions encode the full length of DUX4 protein (DUX4-fl), differing only in the noncoding regions. Only certain versions of these DUX4-fl encoding mature RNAs are implicated in FSHD. Beyond just the DUX4 region, multiple RNA transcripts are produced from the D4Z4 repeat array, both sense and antisense, some of which might be degraded in areas to produce si-like small RNAs. Some transcripts that originate centromeric to the D4Z4 repeat array at the non-deleted element (NDE), termed D4Z4 regulatory element transcripts (DBE-T), could play a role in DUX4 derepression. One proposed mechanism is that DBE-T leads to the recruitment of the trithorax-group protein Ash1L, an increase in H3K36me2-methylation, and ultimately de-repression of 4q35 genes.

Chromatin profiles
	DNA methylation	H3K4me2	H3K9me3	H3K27me3
FSHD1	↓	↑	↓	
FSHD2*	↓	↑	↓	↑
*Chromatin profiles not fully characterized for DNMT3B mutation

=== FSHD1 ===
FSHD involving deletion of D4Z4 repeats (termed 'D4Z4 contraction') on 4q is classified as FSHD1, which accounts for 95% of FSHD cases. Typically, chromosome 4 includes between 11 and 150 D4Z4 repeats. In FSHD1, there are 1–10 D4Z4 repeats. The number of repeats is roughly inversely related to disease severity. Namely, those with 8–10 repeats tend to have the mildest presentations, sometimes with no symptoms; those with 4–7 repeats have moderate disease that is highly variable; and those with 1–3 repeats are more likely to have severe, atypical, and early-onset disease. Deleting the entire D4Z4 repeat array does not result in FSHD because there are no complete copies of DUX4 to be expressed, although other birth defects result. One contracted D4Z4 repeat array with an adjoining 4qA allele is sufficient to cause disease, so inheritance is autosomal dominant. De novo (new) mutations are implicated in 10–30% of cases, up to 40% of which exhibit somatic mosaicism. In an individual with mosaic FSHD, the severity of the disease is correlated to the proportion of their cells carrying the mutation.

Such contractions can also arise after conception: in some apparently sporadic cases they occur during early embryonic cell divisions rather than being inherited from a parent's germline or somatic lineages, so that only part of the body's cells carry them and affected individuals are mosaic for both their somatic tissue and their own germ cells. This can explain FSHD presenting with no family history. In such parents the contraction is carried by fewer than half of gametes on average (transmission less frequent than from a non-mosaic carrier), but any child who inherits it carries that allele in every cell and may be more severely affected than the mosaic parent.

It has been proposed that FSHD1 undergoes anticipation, a phenomenon primarily associated with trinucleotide repeat disorders in which disease manifestation worsens with each subsequent generation. As of 2019, more detailed studies are needed to show definitively whether or not anticipation occurs. If anticipation does occur in FSHD, the mechanism is different than that of trinucleotide repeat disorders, since D4Z4 repeats are much larger than trinucleotide repeats, an underabundance of repeats (rather than overabundance) causes disease, and the repeat array size in FSHD is stable across generations.

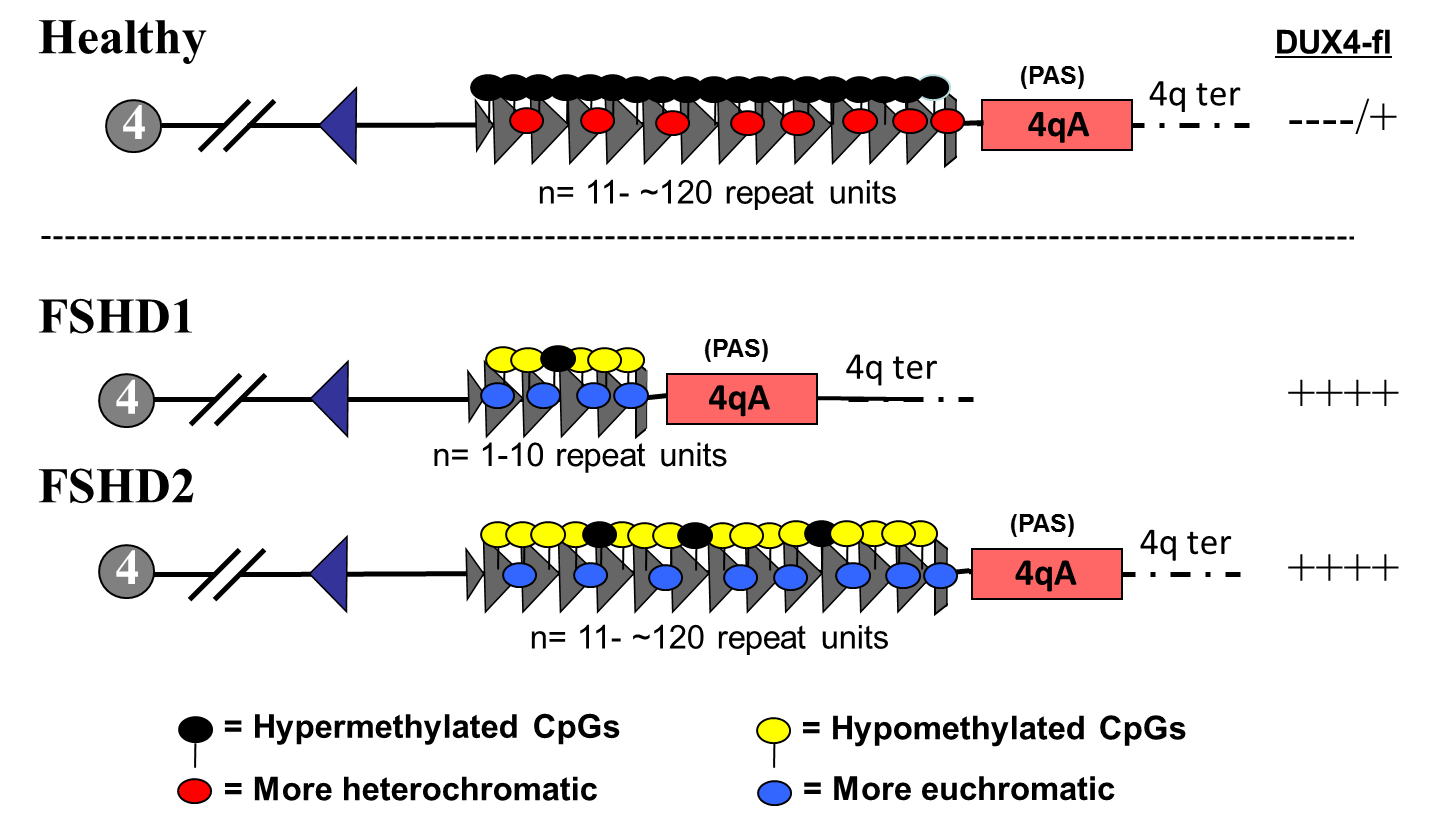
D4Z4 array examples, with each D4Z4 repeat represented by a triangle. The circles above the triangles represent DNA methylation, which determines DNA packaging as represented by the circles in line with the triangles.

=== FSHD2 ===
FSHD with a D4Z4 array repeat size of 11 or greater is classified as FSHD2, responsible for 5% of FSHD cases. A 4qA allele is still required, and its adjacent D4Z4 repeat array is typically borderline shortened, with less than 30 repeats. A deactivating mutation in one of several DNA methylation genes is required for FSHD2, which contributes to hypomethylation of a borderline-shortened D4Z4 repeat array, at which the genetic mechanism converges with FSHD1. At least 85% of FSHD2 cases involve mutations in the gene SMCHD1 (structural maintenance of chromosomes flexible hinge domain containing 1) on chromosome 18. Specific mutations of SMCHD1 are also associated with Bosma arhinia and microphthalmia syndrome. Another cause of FSHD2 is mutation in DNMT3B (DNA methyltransferase 3B). Mutations in DNMT3B can also cause ICF syndrome. As of 2020, early evidence indicates that a third cause of FSHD2 is mutation of the LRIF1 gene, which encodes the protein ligand-dependent nuclear receptor-interacting factor 1 (LRIF1). LRIF1 is known to interact with the SMCHD1 protein. As of 2019, it is presumed that mutation of additional, unidentified genes can cause FSHD2.

FSHD2 associated with SMCHD1 or DNMT3B mutation, only requires one abnormal allele. These FSHD2-causative genes are not located next to the required D4Z4 array/4qA allele within the genome, and are thus inherited independently, resulting in a biallelic digenic inheritance pattern. For example, one parent without FSHD can pass on an SMCHD1 mutation, and the other parent, also without FSHD, can pass on a borderline-shortened D4Z4/4qA allele, bearing a child with FSHD2. For FSHD2 associated with LRIF1 mutation, both LRIF1 alleles need to be mutated, which theoretically yields an even more complex inheritance pattern, termed triallelic digenic.

=== A single disorder on a severity spectrum ===
FSHD1 and FSHD2 have traditionally been viewed as separate entities with distinct genetic causes, although their downstream mechanisms merge. That convergence is complete at the molecular level: in both forms, loss of repressive DNA methylation at D4Z4 permits aberrant DUX4 expression — array size sets this risk in FSHD1, while pathogenic variants in chromatin regulators such as SMCHD1, DNMT3B or LRIF1 do so in FSHD2. The genetic causes can therefore be viewed not as separate diagnoses but as co-occurring risk factors on a single disease spectrum, and an affected individual may have contributions from both. In combined cases the D4Z4 array is typically at the upper end of the FSHD1 range (9–10 repeat units), where it can be considered an overlap zone between FSHD1 and FSHD2; a pathogenic SMCHD1 variant co-segregating with that allele makes disease manifest or more severe than array size alone would predict, because the two factors act additively.

==== Early onset and severe forms ====
At one extreme of this spectrum sit very short arrays: when a contracted D4Z4 on a permissive 4qA allele leaves only 1–3 repeat units, disease is most likely to be severe, atypical and early-onset. Such contractions are more often de novo than in inherited FSHD overall, or reflect undetected parental somatic mosaicism behind apparently new cases, — which is why even the most severe presentations can occur with no affected relatives. In mosaic carriers, severity tracks the fraction of cells carrying the mutation.

At the most extreme genetic end sit biallelic SMCHD1 variants. These cause Bosma arhinia microphthalmia syndrome with an FSHD-like myopathy in which D4Z4 arrays are hypomethylated even at normal length; because identical pathogenic SMCHD1 variants can produce either disorder, the two conditions likely share part of a common mechanism.

==== Borderline arrays: the FSHD1/FSHD2 overlap zone ====
At the other extreme sit borderline-sized arrays — roughly eight to ten D4Z4 repeat units on an otherwise permissive allele — which current diagnostic guidelines designate as a gray zone between disease-causing and normal array sizes, sitting where type boundaries blur. These alleles are common among healthy people: 8-to-10-unit arrays occur at roughly one to two percent of the European control population on permissive haplotypes with no clinical signs or family history of FSHD, so borderline arrays function less as deterministic markers than as a risk factor or modifier for the disease. Consistent with that, clinical expression in carriers of these arrays is milder and later-onset on average yet highly variable: within this single size range it spans asymptomatic individuals to severe disability, often without affected relatives. A combined FSHD1/FSHD2 presentation, in which the borderline array co-segregates with a pathogenic variant of SMCHD1, is most common at nine to ten repeats and acts additively on severity. Additional genetic elements within 4q35 further modify how strongly DUX4 expression is induced in these carriers, including biallelic DUX4-expression status of the permissive allele.

== Pathophysiology ==
=== Molecular ===
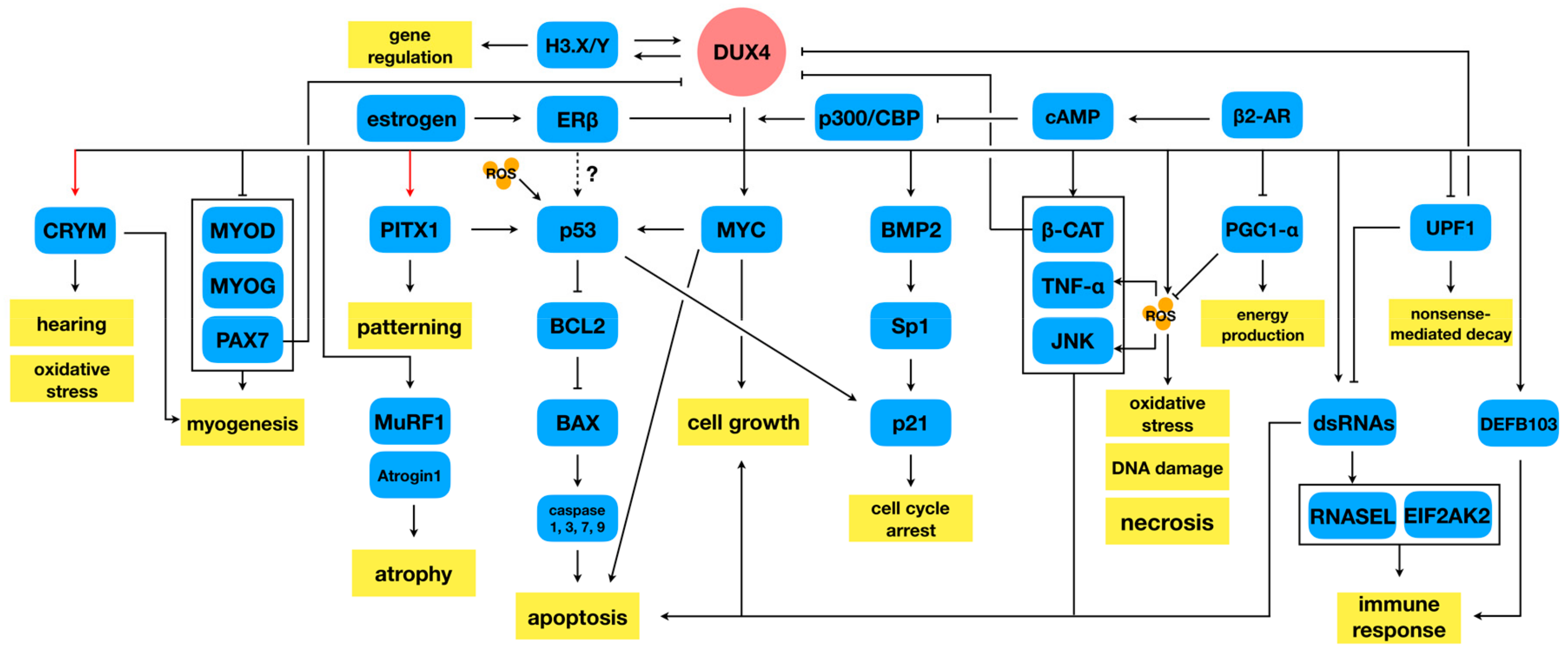
DUX4 signaling in FSHD-affected skeletal muscle

As of 2020, there seems to be a consensus that aberrant expression of DUX4 in muscle is the cause of FSHD. DUX4 is expressed in minuscule amounts, detectable in 1 out of every 1000 immature muscle cells (myoblast), which is even rarer in mature, multinucleated myofibers than it appears in dividing myoblast cultures; a single nucleus expressing DUX4 can nonetheless provide DUX4 protein to neighboring nuclei within the fused cell.

The limited reach of a rare expression event would seem insufficient on its own, so two features appear to amplify it. A mature myofiber is one tube in which hundreds of nuclei share the same cytoplasm (a syncytium), and DUX4 protein made by an active nucleus can spread within that shared space: target genes are activated in neighboring "bystander" nuclei even though those never transcribed DUX4 themselves. Single-nucleus analyses of patient muscle have found such bystander subpopulations, carrying a DUX4-imprinted transcriptional program without local DUX4 transcript. Each expression event also appears to prime subsequent ones: some DUX4-induced targets — including the histone variants H3.X and H3.Y, which are incorporated into actively expressed DUX4-activated genes — prolong their own expression after a burst ends and make re-induction easier, an epigenetic "memory" of prior activation. Repeated rare bursts striking different nuclei in this way over time could thus gradually build up the widespread degeneration characteristic of FSHD muscle.

How the DUX4 protein causes muscle damage remains an area of active research. DUX4 protein is a transcription factor that regulates many other genes. Some of these genes are involved in apoptosis, such as p53, p21, MYC, and β-catenin, and indeed it seems that DUX4 protein makes muscle cells more prone to apoptosis. Other DUX4 protein-regulated genes are involved in oxidative stress, and it seems that DUX4 expression lowers muscle cell tolerance of oxidative stress. Variations in individual muscles' ability to tolerate oxidative stress could partially explain the muscle involvement patterns of FSHD. DUX4 protein downregulates many genes involved in muscle development, including MyoD, myogenin, desmin, and PAX7, and indeed DUX4 expression has shown to reduce muscle cell proliferation, differentiation, and fusion. DUX4 protein regulates a few genes that are involved in RNA quality control, and indeed DUX4 expression has been shown to cause accumulation of RNA with subsequent apoptosis. Estrogen seems to play a role in modifying DUX4 protein effects on muscle differentiation, which could explain why females are less affected than males, although it remains unproven.

A single study reported that the cellular hypoxia response was the main driver of DUX4 protein-induced muscle cell death. The hypoxia-inducible factors (HIFs) are upregulated by DUX4 protein, possibly provoking pathologic signaling, which leads to cell death.

Another study found that DUX4 expression in muscle cells led to the recruitment and alteration of fibrous/fat progenitor cells, which helps explain why muscles become replaced by fat and fibrous tissue.

A single study implicated RIPK3 in DUX4-mediated cell death.

=== Muscle histology ===
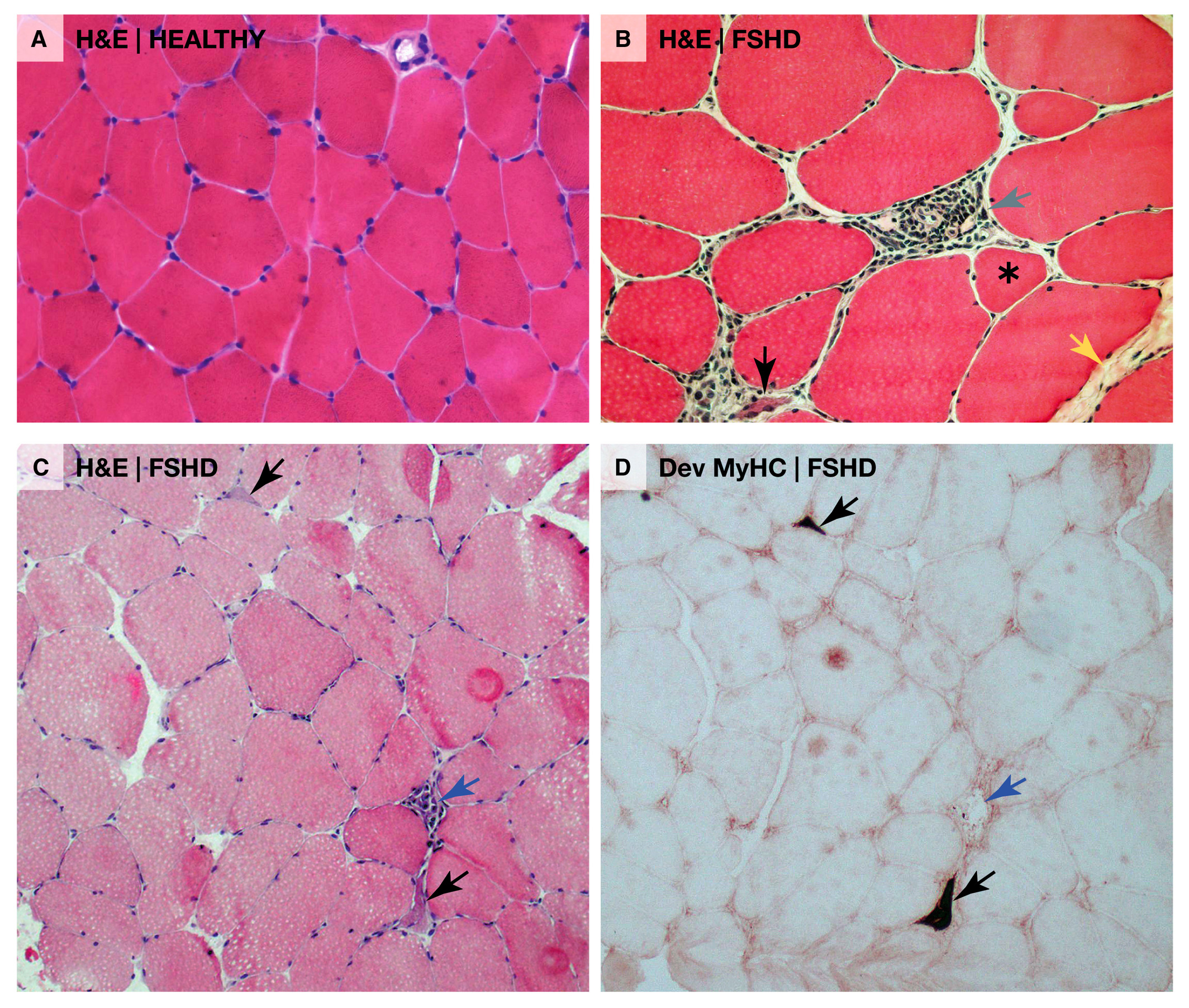
Microscopic cross-sectional views of FSHD-affected muscle fibers. Visible is inflammation and fibrosis, as well as muscle fiber shape change, death, and regeneration.

Unlike other muscular dystrophies, early muscle biopsies show only mild degrees of fibrosis, muscle fiber hypertrophy, and displacement of nuclei from myofiber peripheries (central nucleation). More often found is inflammation. There can be endomysial inflammation, primarily composed of CD8+ T-cells. However, these cells do not seem to cause muscle fiber death directly. Endomysial blood vessels can be surrounded by inflammation, which is relatively unique to FSHD, and this inflammation contains CD4+ T-cells. Inflammation is succeeded by deposition of fat (fatty infiltration), then fibrosis. Individual muscle fibers can appear whorled, moth-eaten, and, especially, lobulated.

These changes are focal rather than uniform: biopsies taken from regions that look active on MRI show patchy areas of segmental degeneration, regeneration with central nuclei and inflammatory remodeling interspersed within a single muscle by relatively preserved myofibers. Regions in which DUX4 activity is ongoing tend to cluster — muscles bright on STIR/TIRM sequences carry the strongest DUX4 target-gene signatures even when fatty infiltration is still mild, while clinically inactive or already fibrotic regions show them less consistently. Over months this produces a patchwork in which some fibers are actively remodeling (replaced by fat and connective tissue), others newly acquire activity stochastically, and previously damaged ones stay damaged — the microscopic correlate of FSHD's uneven involvement pattern.

=== Muscle involvement pattern ===
Why certain muscles are preferentially affected in FSHD is not yet fully understood; multiple patterns of involvement are observed, possibly hinting at underlying pathophysiology. Individual muscles can weaken while adjacent muscles remain strong. The right shoulder and arm muscles are more often affected than the left upper extremity muscles, a pattern also seen in Poland syndrome and hereditary neuralgic amyotrophy; this could reflect a genetic, developmental/anatomic, or functional-related mechanism. At the level of individual myofibers the picture is mosaic rather than uniform: DUX4 expression stays rare and focal even within one muscle because derepression remains incomplete (see Genetics section), so whether a given fiber segment crosses into an active state depends on local factors — nearby inflammatory foci, epigenetic "memory" left by earlier bursts in that region, the mechanical load at myotendinous junctions, or features of the neuromuscular junction. Over time this produces two coexisting transcriptional trajectories within a single fiber and muscle overall, one adaptive (myogenic) and one dystrophic (stress response with suppressed myogenesis), which may help explain why weakness is patchy from muscle to muscle, asymmetric between sides, and uneven even inside a single limb. The deltoid is often spared, which is not seen in any other condition that affects the muscles around the scapula.

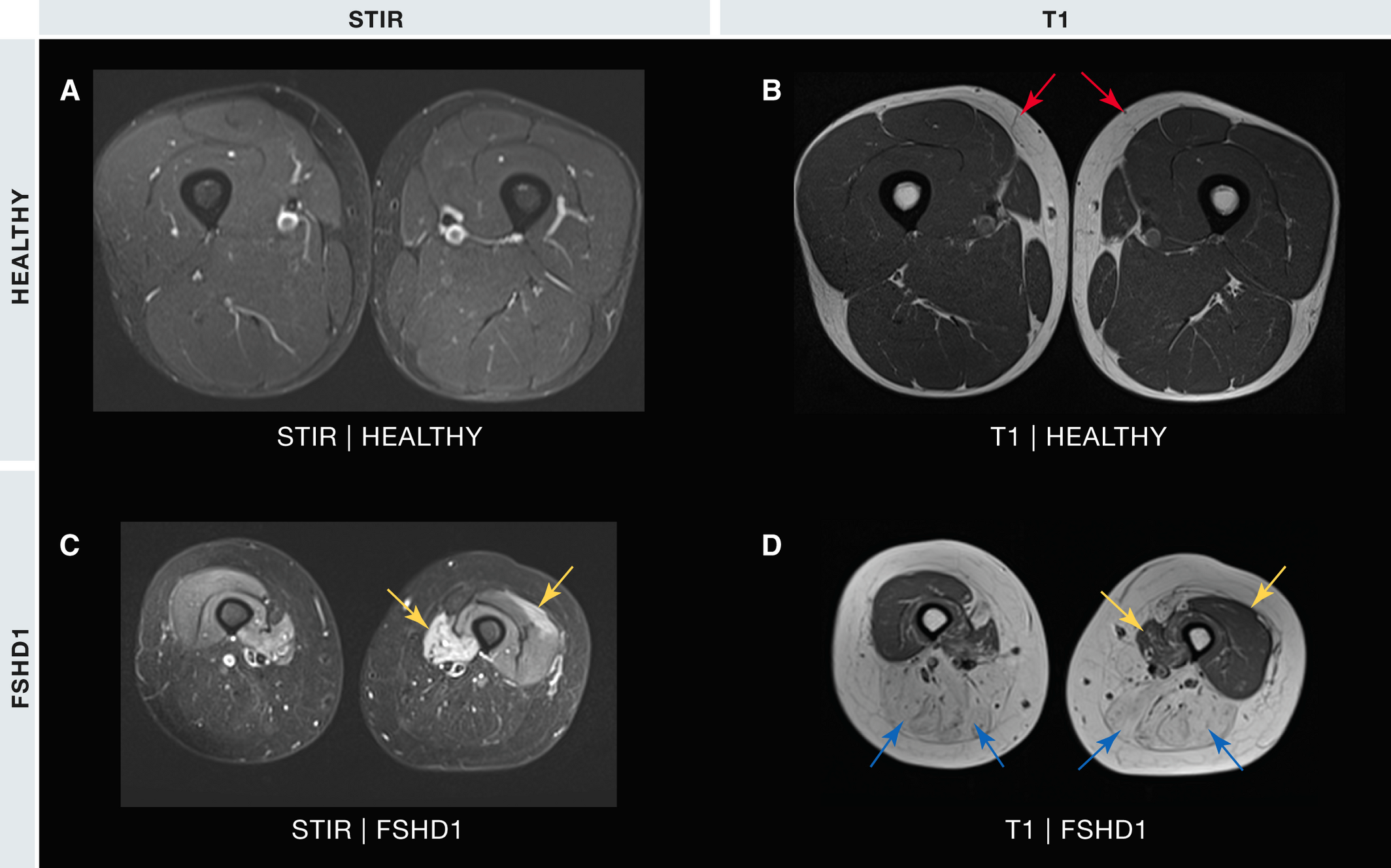
Examples of MRI imaging in FSHD. The white within the muscles of the STIR (T2) image represents muscle edema. The white within the muscles of the T1 images represents fatty infiltration.

Medical imaging (CT and MRI) have shown muscle involvement not readily apparent otherwise

- A single MRI study shows the teres major muscle to be commonly affected.
- The semimembranosus muscle, part of the hamstrings, is commonly affected, deemed by one author to be "the most frequently and severely affected muscle."
- Of the quadriceps muscles, the rectus femoris is preferentially affected
- Of the gastrocnemius, the medial section is preferentially affected;
- The iliopsoas, a hip flexor muscle, is very often spared.

=== Retinopathy ===
Tortuosity of the retinal arterioles, and less often microaneurysms and telangiectasia, are commonly found in FSHD. Abnormalities of the capillaries and venules are not observed. One theory for why the arterioles are selectively affected is that they contain smooth muscle. The degree of D4Z4 contraction correlates to the severity of tortuosity of arterioles. It has been hypothesized that retinopathy is due to DUX4-protein-induced modulation of the CXCR4–SDF1 axis, which has a role in endothelial tip cell morphology and vascular branching.

== Diagnosis ==
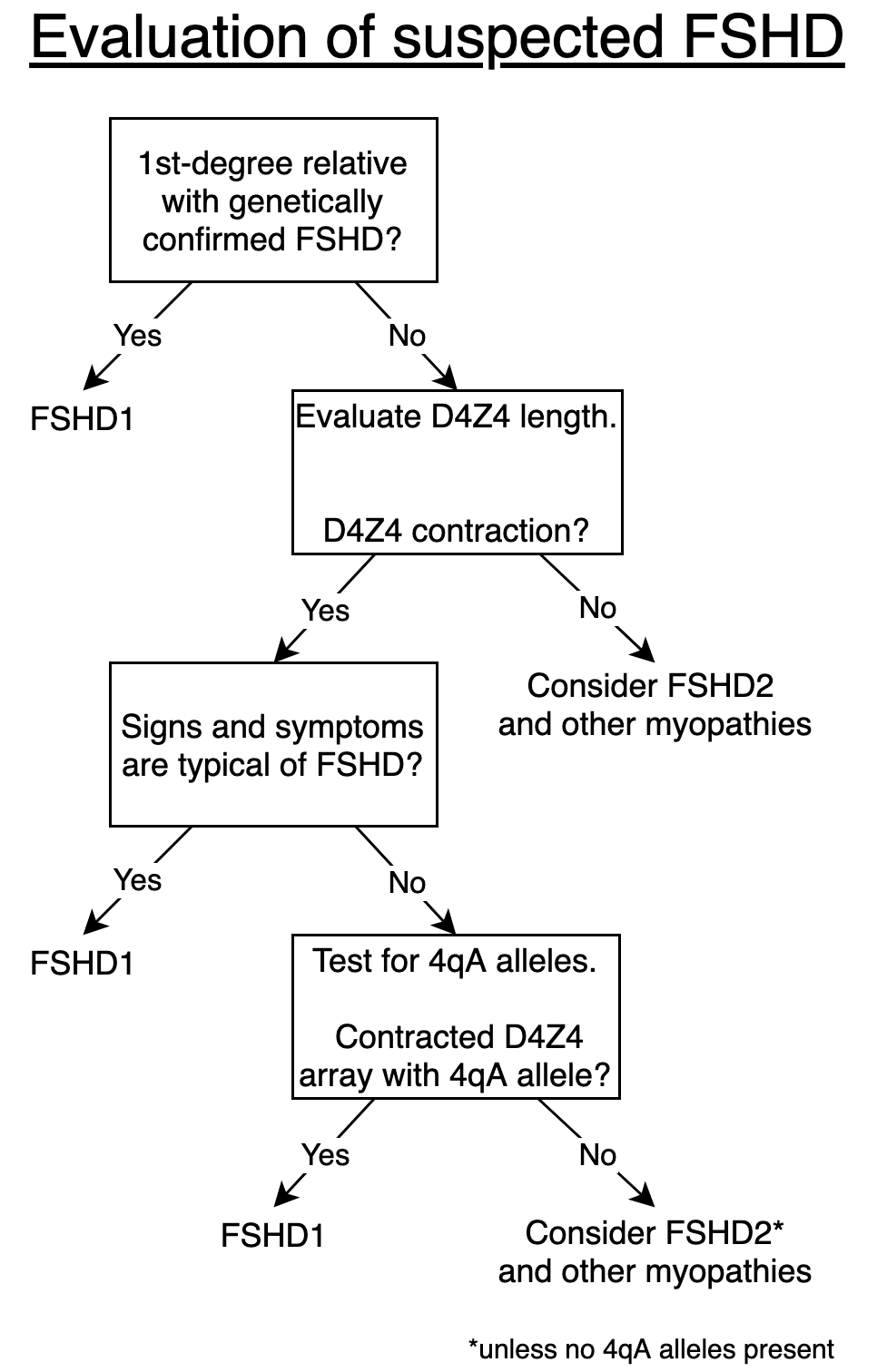
American Academy of Neurology (ANN) guidelines for genetic testing for suspected FSHD. Not all laboratories follow this workflow.

FSHD can be presumptively diagnosed in many cases based on signs, symptoms, and/or non-genetic medical tests, especially if a first-degree relative has genetically confirmed FSHD. Genetic testing can provide definitive diagnosis. In the absence of an established family history of FSHD, diagnosis can be difficult due to the variability in how FSHD manifests.

=== Genetic testing ===
Genetic testing is the gold standard for FSHD diagnosis, as it is the most sensitive and specific test available. Commonly, FSHD1 is tested for first. A shortened D4Z4 array length (EcoRI length of 10 kb to 38 kb) with an adjacent 4qA allele supports FSHD1. If FSHD1 is not present, commonly FSHD2 is tested for next by assessing methylation at 4q35. Low methylation (less than 20%) in the context of a 4qA allele is sufficient for diagnosis. The specific mutation, usually one of the various SMCHD1 mutations, can be identified with next-generation sequencing (NGS).

==== Assessing D4Z4 length ====
Measuring D4Z4 length is technically challenging since the D4Z4 repeat array consists of long, repetitive elements. For example, NGS is not useful for assessing D4Z4 length, because it breaks DNA into fragments before reading them, and it is unclear from which D4Z4 repeat each sequenced fragment came. In 2020, optical mapping became available for measuring D4Z4 array length, which is more precise and less labor-intensive than Southern blot. Molecular combing is also available for assessing D4Z4 array length. These methods, which physically measure the size of the D4Z4 repeat array, require specially prepared high-quality and high molecular weight genomic DNA (gDNA) from serum, increasing cost and reducing accessibility to testing.

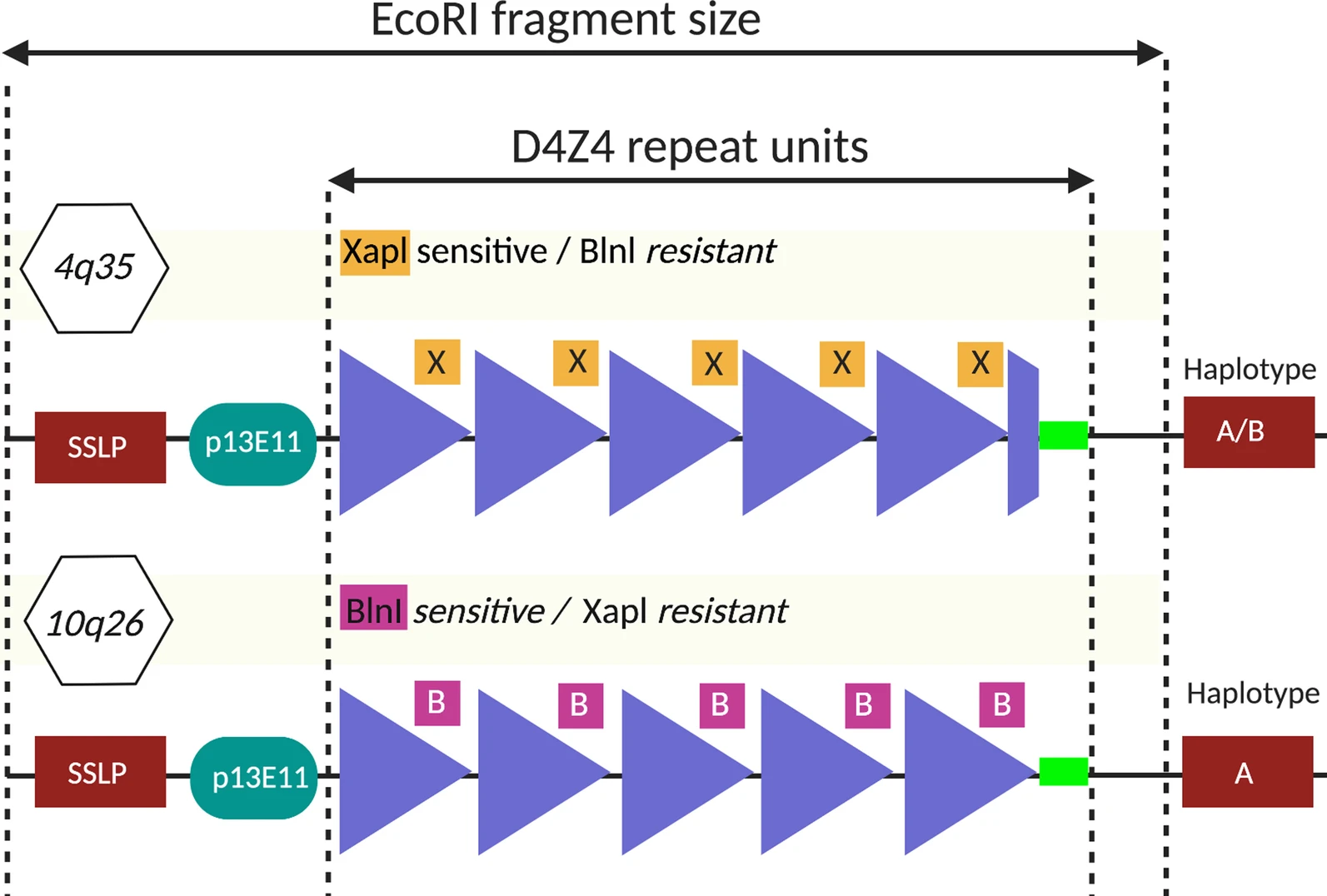
Diagram showing restriction enzyme sites used to differentiate between D4Z4 repeat arrays of 4q and 10q

Restriction fragment length polymorphism (RFLP) analysis was the first genetic test developed and is still used as of 2020, although newer methods are poised to supplant this test. It involves dicing the DNA with restriction enzymes and sorting the resulting restriction fragments by size using southern blot. The restriction enzymes EcoRI and BlnI are commonly used. EcoRI isolates the 4q and 10q repeat arrays, and BlnI dices the 10q sequence into small pieces, allowing 4q to be distinguished. The EcoRI restriction fragment is composed of three parts: 1) 5.7 kb proximal part, 2) the central, variable size D4Z4 repeat array, and 3) the distal part, usually 1.25 kb. The proximal portion has a sequence of DNA stainable by the probe p13E-11, which is commonly used to visualize the EcoRI fragment during southern blot. The name "p13E-11" reflects that it is a subclone of a DNA sequence designated as cosmid 13E during the human genome project. Considering that each D4Z4 repeat is 3.3 kb, and the EcoRI fragment contains about 5 kb of DNA that is not part of the D4Z4 repeat array, the number of D4Z4 units can be calculated.

D4Z4 repeats = (EcoRI length - 5) / 3.3

Sometimes 4q or 10q will have a combination of D4Z4 and D4Z4-like repeats due to DNA exchange between 4q and 10q, which can yield erroneous results that require a more detailed workup. Sometimes D4Z4 repeat array deletions can include the p13E-11 binding site, warranting use of alternate probes.

==== Assessing methylation status ====
The methylation status of 4q35 is traditionally assessed after FSHD1 testing is negative. Methylation sensitive restriction enzyme (MSRE) digestion showing hypomethylation has long been considered diagnostic of FSHD2. Other methylation assays have been proposed or used in research settings, including methylated DNA immunoprecipitation and bisulfite sequencing, but are not routinely used in clinical practice. Bisulfite sequencing, if validated, would be valuable due to its ability to use lower-quality DNA sources, such as those found in saliva.

=== Auxiliary testing ===
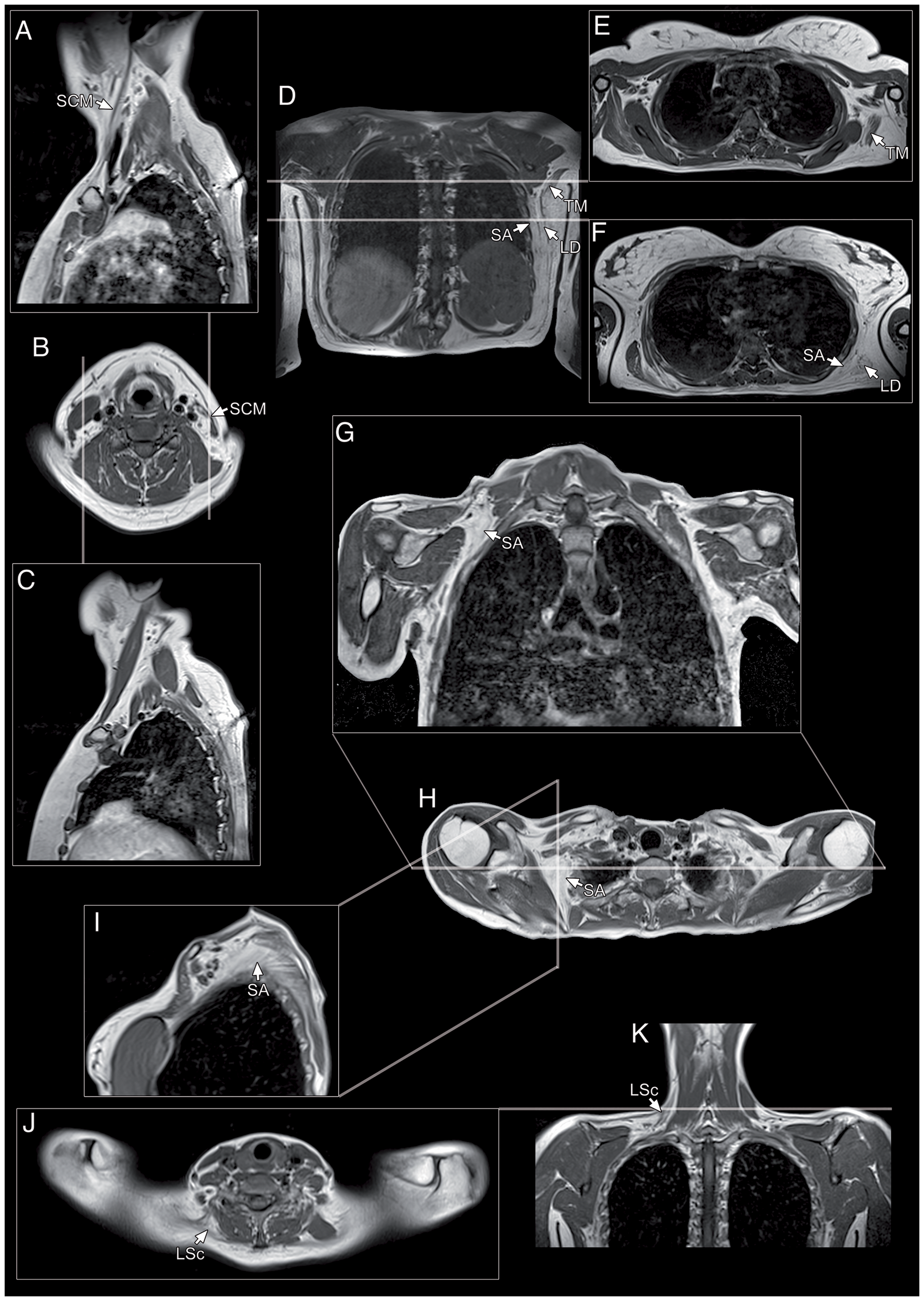
MRI showing asymmetrical involvement of various muscles in FSHD

Other tests can support the diagnosis of FSHD, although they are all less sensitive and less specific than genetic testing. Nonetheless, they can rule out similar-appearing conditions.

- Creatine kinase (CK) blood level is often ordered when muscle damage is suspected. CK is an enzyme found in muscle, leaking into the blood when muscles become damaged. In FSHD, CK level is normal to mildly elevated, never exceeding five times the upper limit of normal.
- Electromyogram (EMG) measures the electrical activity in the muscle. EMG can show nonspecific signs of muscle damage or irritability.
- Nerve conduction velocity (NCV) measures how fast signals travel along a nerve. Nerve signals are measured with surface electrodes (similar to those used for an electrocardiogram) or needle electrodes. FSHD does not affect nerve conduction velocity; abnormal nerve conduction would point towards a neuropathy rather than myopathy.
- Muscle biopsy is the surgical removal and examination of a small piece of muscle, usually from the arm or leg. Microscopy and a variety of biochemical tests are used for examination. Findings in FSHD are nonspecific, such as the presence of white blood cells or variation in muscle fiber size. This test is rarely indicated.
- Magnetic resonance imaging (MRI) is sensitive for detecting muscle damage, even in mild cases. T1-weighted MRI can visualize fatty infiltration of muscles, and T2-weighted MRI can visualize muscle edema. MRI can help differentiate FSHD from other muscle diseases based on the pattern of muscles involved, directing genetic testing.
- Ultrasound (US) can be used to image muscles. US is effective at identifying fatty infiltration or scarring of muscles due to FSHD, manifesting as increased echogenicity (appearing brighter on ultrasound imaging). Advantages of US, compared to MRI or computed tomography, include low cost and no radiation exposure. However, ultrasound has a poorer evaluation of deeper muscles, and ultrasonic findings tend to be more operator-dependent.
- Computed tomography (CT, also referred to as 'CAT') is not routinely used for muscle imaging due to the risks of radiation and inferior characterization of soft tissues (ie, parts of the body other than bone). Muscle that is incidentally imaged with CT can appear atrophied and lower density due to fatty replacement. CT has a limited ability to detect the inflammatory changes of muscle that MRI can detect.

=== Differential diagnosis ===
Included in the differential diagnosis of FSHD are limb-girdle muscular dystrophy (especially calpainopathy), scapuloperoneal myopathy, mitochondrial myopathy, Pompe disease, and polymyositis. Calpainopathy and scapuloperoneal myopathy, like FSHD, present with scapular winging. Features that suggest FSHD are facial weakness, asymmetric weakness, and lack of benefit from immunosuppression medications. Features that suggest an alternative diagnosis are contractures, respiratory insufficiency, weakness of muscles controlling eye movement, and weakness of the tongue or throat.

== Management ==
No pharmacologic treatment has proven to slow the progression of weakness significantly or improve strength meaningfully.

=== Screening and monitoring of complications ===
The American Academy of Neurology (AAN) recommends several medical tests to detect complications of FSHD. A dilated eye exam to look for retinal abnormalities is recommended in those newly diagnosed with FSHD; for those with large D4Z4 deletions, an evaluation by a retinal specialist is recommended yearly. A hearing test is recommended for individuals with early-onset FSHD before starting school, or for any other FSHD-affected individual with symptoms of hearing loss. Pulmonary function testing (PFT) is recommended in those newly diagnosed to establish baseline pulmonary function, and recurrently for those with pulmonary insufficiency symptoms or risks. Routine screening for heart conditions, such as through an electrocardiogram (EKG) or echocardiogram (echo), is considered unnecessary in those without symptoms of heart disease.

=== Physical and occupational therapy ===
Aerobic exercise has been shown to reduce chronic fatigue and decelerate fatty infiltration of muscle in FSHD. The AAN recommends that people with FSHD engage in low-intensity aerobic exercise to promote energy levels, muscle health, and bone health, and physical activity in general might slow disease progression in the legs. Resistance training—particularly at higher loads—is an established way to build muscle mass and strength, which improves gait speed, balance, and everyday task performance in other populations. In the few studies conducted so far with people living with FSHD, resistance exercises have been consistently well tolerated. Patients should begin with light loads and few sets causing no lasting weakness, then progressively add weight over weeks as tolerated under the guidance of a trainer familiar with FSHD.

There is no standardized protocol for Physical therapy in FSHD; it can address specific symptoms. Anecdotal reports suggest that appropriately applied kinesiology tape can reduce pain. Braces are often used to address muscle weakness. Scapular bracing can improve scapular positioning, which improves shoulder function, although it is often deemed ineffective or impractical. Ankle-foot orthoses (AFOs) can improve walking, balance, and quality of life.

Occupational therapy can be used for training in activities of daily living (ADLs) and to help adapt to new assistive devices. Cognitive behavioral therapy (CBT) has been shown to reduce chronic fatigue in FSHD, and it also decelerates fatty infiltration of muscle when directed towards increasing daily activity.

=== Pharmacologic management ===
No pharmaceuticals have definitively proven effective for altering the disease course. Although a few pharmaceuticals have shown improved muscle mass in limited respects, they did not improve quality of life, and the AAN recommends against their use for FSHD. Musculoskeletal pain is common in FSHD, affecting about half of patients. It can be treated with analgesics or nonsteroidal anti-inflammatory drugs when there are no contraindications; anticonvulsants and antidepressants may also be considered for persistent musculoskeletal pain. Because major depressive disorder heightens the perception of pain, it should be checked in all patients.

=== Reconstructive surgery ===
Scapular winging is amenable to surgical correction, namely, operative scapular fixation. Scapular fixation is the restriction and stabilization of the position of the scapula, putting it in closer apposition to the rib cage and reducing winging. Absolute restriction of scapular motion by fixation of the scapula to the ribs is most commonly reported. This procedure often involves inducing bony fusion, called arthrodesis, between the scapula and ribs. Names for this include scapulothoracic fusion, scapular fusion, and scapulodesis. This procedure increases arm active range of motion, improves arm function, decreases pain, and improves cosmetic appearance. Active range of motion of the arm increases most in the setting of severe scapular winging with an unaffected deltoid muscle; however, passive range of motion decreases. In other words, the patient gains the ability to slowly raise their arms to 90+ degrees, but they lose the ability to "throw" their arm up to a full 180 degrees. The AAN states that scapular fixation can be offered cautiously to select patients after balancing these benefits against the adverse consequences of surgery and prolonged immobilization.

Another form of operative scapular fixation is scapulopexy. "Scapulo-" refers to the scapula bone, and "-pexy" is derived from the Greek root "to bind." Some versions of scapulopexy accomplish essentially the same result as scapulothoracic fusion. Instead of inducing bony fusion, the scapula is secured to the ribs with only wire, tendon grafts, or other material. Some versions of scapulopexy do not completely restrict scapular motion, examples including tethering the scapula to the ribs, vertebrae, or other scapula. Scapulopexy is considered to be more conservative than scapulothoracic fusion, with reduced recovery time and less effect on breathing. However, they also seem more susceptible to long-term failure. Another form of scapular fixation, although not commonly done in FSHD, is tendon transfer, which involves surgically rearranging the attachments of muscles to bone. Examples include pectoralis major transfer and the Eden–Lange procedure.

Various other surgical reconstructions have been described. Upper eyelid gold implants have been used for those unable to close their eyes. Drooping lower lip has been addressed with plastic surgery. Ability to smile can theoretically be restored with a tendon transfer, with donors such as a portion of the temporalis muscle, although evidence is lacking in FSHD. Select cases of foot drop can be surgically corrected with tendon transfer, in which the tibialis posterior muscle is repurposed as a tibialis anterior muscle, a version of this being called the Bridle procedure. Severe scoliosis caused by FSHD can be corrected with spinal fusion; however, since scoliosis might be a compensatory change in response to muscle weakness, correction of spinal alignment can result in further impaired muscle function.

Scapular winging management

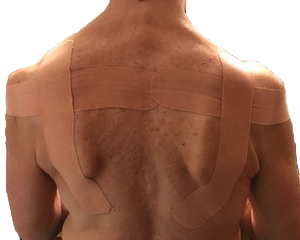
Kinesiology tape applied across the scapulas

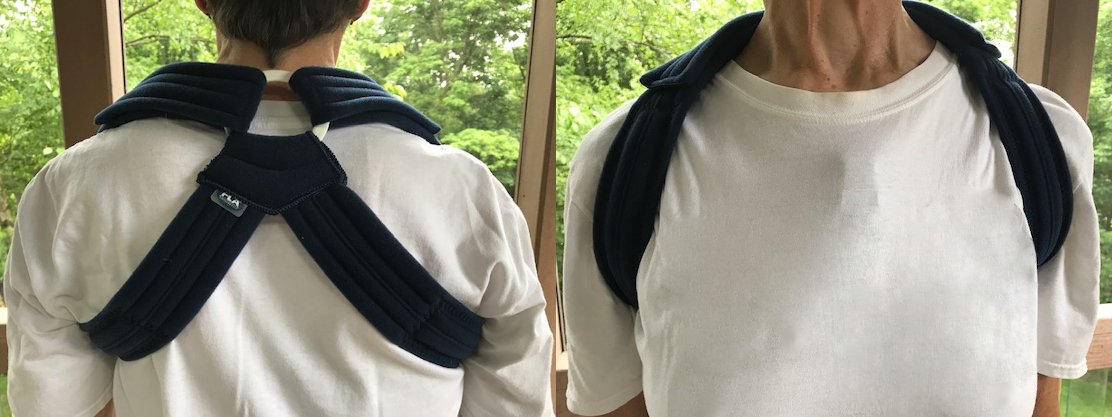
A cloth brace to hold the scapulas in retraction to reduce shoulder symptoms, such as collarbone pain

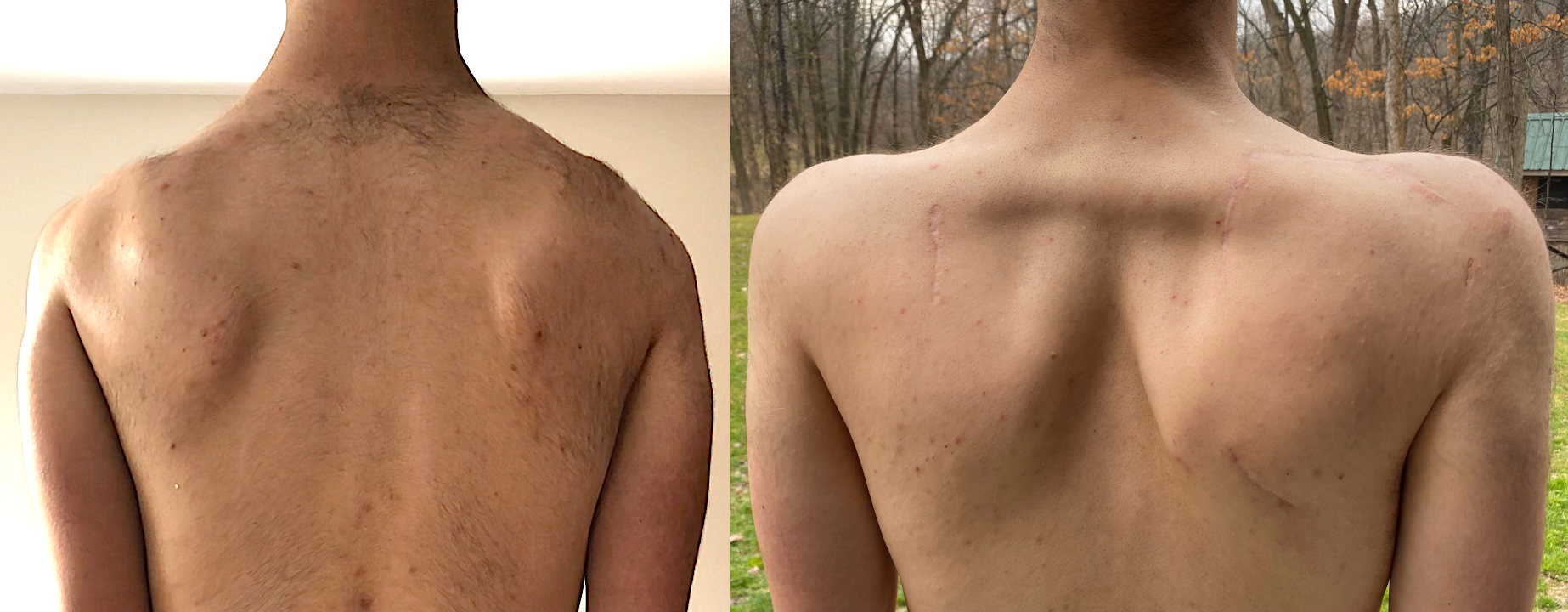
Scapula-to-scapula scapulopexy, pre- and post-operation. The scapulas are tethered together into a retracted position with an Achilles tendon graft, which, in this case, rendered the rhomboid major muscles distinguishable.

== Prognosis ==
FSHD develops insidiously, with a progressive highly variable course over decades. Most individuals present in their late teens to early adulthood. Even among relatives who carry identical FSHD-related sequence variations there is often striking heterogeneity in both age at onset and severity; in some large families a substantial fraction of carriers show no noticeable symptoms, while others with the same mutation remain limited to facial and shoulder weakness over their lifetime.

Genetic findings partially predict prognosis. In FSHD type 1, disease generally scales inversely with the number of D4Z4 repeats remaining on affected alleles: those who have large deletions (with a remaining D4Z4 repeat array size of 10–20 kbp, or 1–4 residual repeats) are more likely to have severe and early-onset disease as well as non-muscular symptoms.

Individuals with D4Z4 contractions in the "borderline" range (more than seven repeats) show greater variability in age at onset and severity of progression, a distribution of weakness that diverges from the classic phenotype, and more frequent asymptomatic or nonpenetrant cases despite an otherwise permissive genetic background. In this group, a borderline contraction appears to function less as a deterministic marker than as a susceptibility factor; in some large families 30% of those with the mutation had no noticeable symptoms, and about 30% of symptomatic individuals did not progress beyond facial and shoulder weakness. The extent of DNA hypomethylation at D4Z4 may be a stronger indicator than repeat number alone for who develops clinical FSHD, possibly independent of the size of the contractions.

Variants that modify epigenetic regulation at D4Z4 also affect outcome: carriers of SMCHD1 variants alongside an FSHD-permissive allele may be more severely affected than would be predicted from repeat size alone, and rare DNMT3B variants can alter penetrance.

In severe cases, FSHD can shorten life expectancy. Death is documented but uncommon overall; in one long-term follow-up study, it was reported for roughly 8% of study participants (mean age at death about 62 years); robust population-level survival data are not yet available, so this figure should be read as indicative rather than definitive. Where causes of death were recorded, they most often involved the respiratory or cardiac systems — typically respiratory failure or a respiratory infection, with heart failure and sudden (arrhythmic) deaths also described. Respiratory insufficiency can progress to chronic ventilator dependence requiring non-invasive ventilation, for which reason routine pulmonary monitoring is recommended by the American Academy of Neurology guideline; cardiac evaluation in symptomatic individuals likewise follows from that guidance.

=== Early onset ===
Early onset of FSHD (facial weakness beginning before about age 5, shoulder girdle involvement by roughly age 10) accounts for an estimated 3% to 21% of the total FSHD population. Patients in this group face a higher risk of rapid decline in motor function and muscle wasting, early loss of independent ambulation, and systemic involvement. Motor decline is marked: about 40% become wheelchair-dependent by an average age of around 17 years, versus roughly 10% in the general FSHD population, and many lose independent ambulation early enough to develop spinal deformities such as lumbar hyperlordosis from axial muscle weakness. The systemic burden is likewise heavier: extramuscular features occur at high incidence, including sensorineural hearing loss (in about two-fifths of cases), retinal disease that can lead to vision loss (Coats syndrome; roughly 37% of early-onset patients), and epilepsy which when present always co-occurs with intellectual disability. Restrictive lung disease, scoliosis, and cardiac arrhythmias are also described. In one studied cohort, individuals with this presentation were almost uniformly found to carry very short D4Z4 alleles (three or fewer repeats), often arising de novo. Deaths from respiratory failure and pneumonia have been documented in the most severe infantile courses.

=== Pregnancy ===
Pregnancy outcomes are overall good in mothers with FSHD; there is no difference in the rate of preterm labor, rate of miscarriage, and infant outcomes. However, weakness can increase the need for assisted delivery.

A single review found that weakness worsens, without recovery, in 12% of mothers with FSHD during pregnancy, although this might be due to weight gain or deconditioning.

== Epidemiology ==
The prevalence of FSHD ranges from 1 in 8,333 to 1 in 15,000. The Netherlands reports a prevalence of 1 in 8,333, after accounting for the undiagnosed. The prevalence in the United States is commonly quoted as 1 in 15,000.

After genetic testing became possible in 1992, the average prevalence was found to be around 1 in 20,000, a large increase compared to before 1992. However, 1 in 20,000 is likely an underestimation, since many with FSHD have mild symptoms and are never diagnosed, or they are siblings of affected individuals and never seek definitive diagnosis.

Race and ethnicity have not been shown to affect FSHD incidence or severity.

Although the inheritance of FSHD shows no predilection for biological sex, the disease manifests less often in women, and even when it manifests in women, they, on average, are less severely affected than affected males. Estrogen has been suspected to be a protective factor that accounts for this discrepancy. One study found that estrogen reduced DUX4 activity. However, another study found no association between disease severity and lifetime estrogen exposure in females. The same study found that disease progression was not different through periods of hormonal changes, such as menarche, pregnancy, and menopause.

== History ==
The first description of a person with FSHD in medical literature appears in an autopsy report by Jean Cruveilhier in 1852. In 1868, Duchenne published his seminal work on Duchenne muscular dystrophy, and as part of its differential was a description of FSHD. First in 1874, then with a more commonly cited publication in 1884, and again with pictures in 1885, the French physicians Louis Landouzy and Joseph Dejerine published details of the disease, recognizing it as a distinct clinical entity, and thus FSHD is sometimes referred to as Landouzy Dejerine disease. In their paper of 1886, Landouzy and Dejerine drew attention to the familial nature of the disorder and mentioned that four generations were affected in the kindred that they had investigated. Formal definition of FSHD's clinical features did not occur until 1952, when a large Utah family with FSHD was studied. Beginning around 1980, an increasing interest in FSHD led to a better understanding of the great disease variability and the genetic and pathophysiological complexities. By the late 1990s, researchers were finally beginning to understand the regions of chromosome 4 associated with FSHD.

Since the publication of the unifying theory in 2010, researchers have continued to refine their understanding of DUX4. With increasing confidence in this work, researchers proposed the first a consensus view in 2014 of the pathophysiology of the disease and potential approaches to therapeutic intervention based on that model.

Alternate and historical names for FSHD include the following:

- facioscapulohumeral disease
- faciohumeroscapular
- Landouzy–Dejerine disease (or 'syndrome' or 'type of muscular dystrophy')
- Erb-Landouzy-Dejerine syndrome

=== Chronology of important FSHD-related genetic research ===
1861	Person with muscular dystrophy depicted by Duchenne. Based on the muscles involved, this person could have had FSHD.
1884	Landouzy and Dejerine describe a form of childhood progressive muscle atrophy with characteristic involvement of facial muscles distinct from pseudohypertrophic (Duchenne's MD) and spinal muscle atrophy in adults. Two brothers with FSHD followed by Landouzy and Dejerine Photograph of one brother at age 21. The right scapula is protracted, downwardly rotated, and laterally displaced. Drawing of another brother at age 17. Visible is lumbar hyperlordosis. The upper arm and pectoral muscles appear atrophied.
1886	Landouzy and Dejerine describe progressive muscular atrophy of the scapulo-humeral type.
1950	Tyler and Stephens study 1249 individuals from a single kindred with FSHD traced to a single ancestor and describe a typical Mendelian inheritance pattern with complete penetrance and highly variable expression. The term facioscapulohumeral dystrophy is introduced.
1982	Padberg provides the first linkage studies to determine the genetic locus for FSHD in his seminal thesis "Facioscapulohumeral disease."
1987	The complete sequence of the Dystrophin gene (Duchenne's MD) is determined.
1991	The genetic defect in FSHD is linked to a region (4q35) near the tip of the long arm of chromosome 4.
1992	FSHD, in both familial and de novo cases, is found to be linked to a recombination event that reduces the size of 4q EcoR1 fragment to < 28 kb (50–300 kb normally).
1993	4q EcoR1 fragments are found to contain tandem arrangement of multiple 3.3-kb units (D4Z4), and FSHD is associated with the presence of < 11 D4Z4 units. A study of seven families with FSHD reveals evidence of genetic heterogeneity in FSHD.
1994	The heterochromatic structure of 4q35 is recognized as a factor that may affect the expression of FSHD, possibly via position-effect variegation. DNA sequencing within D4Z4 units shows they contain an open reading frame corresponding to two homeobox domains, but investigators conclude that D4Z4 is unlikely to code for a functional transcript.
1995	The terms FSHD1A and FSHD1B are introduced to describe 4q-linked and non-4q-linked forms of the disease.
1996	FSHD Region Gene1 (FRG1) is discovered 100 kb proximal to D4Z4.
1998	Monozygotic twins with vastly different clinical expression of FSHD are described.
1999	Complete sequencing of 4q35 D4Z4 units reveals a promoter region located 149 bp 5' from the open reading frame for the two homeobox domains, indicating a gene that encodes a protein of 391 amino acid protein (later corrected to 424 aa), given the name DUX4.
2001	Investigators assessed the methylation state (heterochromatin is more highly methylated than euchromatin) of DNA in 4q35 D4Z4. An examination of SmaI, MluI, SacII, and EagI restriction fragments from multiple cell types, including skeletal muscle, revealed no evidence for hypomethylation in cells from FSHD1 patients relative to D4Z4 from unaffected control cells or relative to homologous D4Z4 sites on chromosome 10. However, in all instances, D4Z4 from sperm was hypomethylated relative to D4Z4 from somatic tissues. --- The Muscular Dystrophy Community Assistance, Research and Education Amendments of 2001 (MD-CARE Act; Public Law 107-84) legally mandated structured U.S. federal research funding across all muscular dystrophies. As a direct result, the federal government established the NIH Wellstone Muscular Dystrophy Centers network to fast-track clinical therapies for the muscular dystrophies.
2002	A polymorphic segment of 10 kb directly distal to D4Z4 is found to exist in two allelic forms, designated 4qA and 4qB. FSHD1 is associated solely with the 4qA allele. Three genes (FRG1, FRG2, ANT1) located in the region just centromeric to D4Z4 on chromosome 4 are found in isolated muscle cells from individuals with FSHD at levels 10 to 60 times greater than normal, showing a linkage between D4Z4 contractions and altered expression of 4q35 genes.
2003	A further examination of DNA methylation in different 4q35 D4Z4 restriction fragments (BsaAI and FseI) showed significant hypomethylation at both sites for individuals with FSHD1, non-FSHD-expressing gene carriers, and individuals with phenotypic FSHD relative to unaffected controls.
2004	Contraction of the D4Z4 region on the 4qB allele to < 38 kb does not cause FSHD.
2006	Transgenic mice overexpressing FRG1 are shown to develop severe myopathy.
2007	The DUX4 open reading frame is found to have been conserved in the genome of primates for over 100 million years, supporting the likelihood that it encodes a required protein. Researchers identify DUX4 mRNA in primary FSHD myoblasts and identify in D4Z4-transfected cells a DUX4 protein, the overexpression of which induces cell death. DUX4 mRNA and protein expression are reported to increase in myoblasts from FSHD patients, compared to unaffected controls. Stable DUX4 mRNA is transcribed only from the most distal D4Z4 unit, which uses an intron and a polyadenylation signal provided by the flanking pLAM region. DUX4 protein is identified as a transcription factor, and evidence suggests overexpression of DUX4 is linked to an increase in the target paired-like homeodomain transcription factor 1 (PITX1).
2008	The first NIH Wellstone Center dedicated exclusively to FSHD research opened at the Boston Biomedical Research Institute, with major operations later transitioning to UMass Chan Medical School.
2009	The terms FSHD1 and FSHD2 are introduced to describe D4Z4-deletion-linked and non-D4Z4-deletion-linked genetic forms, respectively. In FSHD1, hypomethylation is restricted to the short 4q allele, whereas FSHD2 is characterized by hypomethylation of both 4q and both 10q alleles. Splicing and cleavage of the terminal (most telomeric) 4q D4Z4 DUX4 transcript in primary myoblasts and fibroblasts from FSHD patients is found to result in the generation of multiple RNAs, including small noncoding RNAs, antisense RNAs and capped mRNAs as new candidates for the pathophysiology of FSHD. Mechanism proposed of DBE-T (D4Z4 Regulatory Element transcript) leading to de-repression of 4q35 genes.
2010	A unifying genetic model of FSHD is established: D4Z4 contractions only cause FSHD when in the context of a 4qA allele due to stabilization of DUX4 RNA transcript, allowing DUX4 expression. Several organizations including The New York Times highlighted this research Francis Collins, who oversaw the first sequencing of the Human Genome with the National Institutes of Health stated: "If we were thinking of a collection of the genome's greatest hits, this would go on the list," Daniel Perez, co-founder of the FSHD Society, hailed the new findings, saying: "This is a long-sought explanation of the exact biological workings of [FSHD]" The MDA stated that: "Now, the hunt is on for which proteins or genetic instructions (RNA) cause the problem for muscle tissue in FSHD." One of the report's co-authors, Silvère van der Maarel of the University of Leiden, stated that "It is amazing to realize that a long and frustrating journey of almost two decades now culminates in the identification of a single small DNA variant that differs between patients and people without the disease. We finally have a target that we can go after." DUX4 is found actively transcribed in skeletal muscle biopsies and primary myoblasts. FSHD-affected cells produce a full-length transcript, DUX4-fl, whereas alternative splicing in unaffected individuals results in the production of a shorter, 3'-truncated transcript (DUX4-s). The low overall expression of both transcripts in muscle is attributed to relatively high expression in a small number of nuclei (~ 1 in 1000). Higher levels of DUX4 expression in human testis (~100 fold higher than skeletal muscle) suggest a developmental role for DUX4 in human development. Higher levels of DUX4-s (vs DUX4-fl) are shown to correlate with a greater degree of DUX-4 H3K9me3-methylation.
2012	Some instances of FSHD2 are linked to mutations in the SMCHD1 gene on chromosome 18, and a genetic/mechanistic intersection of FSHD1 and FSHD2 is established. The prevalence of FSHD-like D4Z4 deletions on permissive alleles is significantly higher than the prevalence of FSHD in the general population, challenging the criteria for molecular diagnosis of FSHD. When expressed in primary myoblasts, DUX4-fl acted as a transcriptional activator, producing a > 3-fold change in the expression of 710 genes. A subsequent study using a larger number of samples identified DUX4-fl expression in myogenic cells and muscle tissue from unaffected relatives of FSHD patients, per se, is not sufficient to cause pathology, and that additional modifiers are determinants of disease progression.
2013	Mutations in SMCHD1 are shown to increase the severity of FSHD1. Transgenic mice carrying D4Z4 arrays from an FSHD1 allele (with 2.5 D4Z4 units), although lacking an obvious FSHD-like skeletal muscle phenotype, are found to recapitulate important genetic expression patterns and epigenetic features of FSHD.
2014	DUX4-fl and downstream target genes are expressed in skeletal muscle biopsies and biopsy-derived cells of fetuses with FSHD-like D4Z4 arrays, indicating that molecular markers of FSHD are already expressed during fetal development. Researchers "review how the contributions from many labs over many years led to an understanding of a fundamentally new mechanism of human disease" and articulate how the unifying genetic model and subsequent research represent a "pivot-point in FSHD research, transitioning the field from discovery-oriented studies to translational studies aimed at developing therapies based on a sound model of disease pathophysiology." They describe the consensus mechanism of pathophysiology for FSHD as an "inefficient repeat-mediated epigenetic repression of the D4Z4 macrosatellite repeat array on chromosome 4, resulting in the variegated expression of the DUX4 retrogene, encoding a double-homeobox transcription factor, in skeletal muscle."
2015	Researchers identify a double-negative feedback loop between DUX4 and nonsense-mediated decay (NMD), an RNA quality-control pathway. The study shows that DUX4 expression promotes the degradation a core NMD factor called UPF1, inhibiting the cell's ability to clear NMD-sensitive transcripts. Because DUX4 mRNA itself is regulated by NMD, this NMD impairment stabilizes DUX4 mRNA and increases the expression of the DUX4 protein, suggesting a mechanism that may amplify or prolong rare DUX4-positive events in FSHD muscle cells".
2018	Following advocacy by the medical community, a unique ICD-10-CM classification code for FSHD (G71.02) went into effect in U.S. health records, allowing health systems to track epidemiological data and identify patients to accelerate clinical trial recruitment.
2019	Evaluation of losmapimod in the randomized, double-blind ReDUX4 trial marked the first clinical-stage drug candidate specifically intended to target and suppress aberrant DUX4 expression in patients.
2020	Voice of the Patient Report released documenting FSHD's impacts on daily life as conveyed by about 400 patients during an FDA externally led Patient-Focused Drug Development meeting, which was held on June 29, 2020.
2023	Project Mercury, a global patient-led coalition of FSHD advocacy organizations spanning ten countries, claims to have expanded qualified clinical trial sites worldwide from 25 to 53, standardized international real-world data collection across its member registries, and built a coordinated cohort of more than 10,000 clinical-trial-ready patients.
2024	A bipartisan coalition introduced a formal congressional resolution establishing federal recognition of World FSHD Day, mandating increased legislative focus on advancing biomedical research and diagnostic development for the disease.
2025	Following a coordinated grassroots advocacy campaign building off congressional momentum, FSHD was officially accepted into the Department of Defense's Peer-Reviewed Medical Research Program (PRMRP). This milestone allowed FSHD researchers to compete for a share of the program's $370 million federal grant pool for the first time.
2026	Researchers review a decade of evidence linking molecular DUX4 derepression to FSHD pathology across multiple biological scales, from rare and transient DUX4 bursts in individual myonuclei to bystander effects within multinucleated muscle fibres, patchy muscle involvement, MRI-detectable disease activity, and clinical trial biomarker design. The review supports a spatiotemporal mosaic model of FSHD pathology and discusses how this framework may inform biomarker development, MRI-guided biopsy selection, and endpoint design. The authors also discuss layered biomarker strategies combining muscle DUX4 target-gene signatures, MRI measures of disease activity and structural damage, and emerging circulating biomarkers, including KHDC1L, which has been proposed as a potential pharmacodynamic marker of DUX4 pathway activity. --- U.S. Food and Drug Administration (FDA) released a Patient Listening Session report on early-onset facioscapulohumeral muscular dystrophy, highlighting the significant physical, emotional, and developmental burdens experienced by individuals diagnosed at a young age.

=== Past pharmaceutical development ===
Early drug trials, before the pathogenesis involving DUX4 was discovered, were untargeted and largely unsuccessful. Compounds were trialed with goals of increasing muscle mass, decreasing inflammation, or addressing provisional theories of disease mechanism. The following drugs failed to show efficacy:

- Prednisone, a steroid, based on its anti-inflammatory properties and therapeutic effect in Duchenne muscular dystrophy.
- Oral albuterol, a β2 agonist, on the basis of its anabolic properties. Although it improved muscle mass and certain measures of strength in those with FSHD, it did not improve global strength or function. Interestingly, β2 agonists were later shown to reduce DUX4 expression.
- Diltiazem, a calcium channel blocker, based on anecdotal reports of benefit and the theory that calcium dysregulation played a part in muscle cell death.
- MYO-029 (stamulumab), an antibody that inhibits myostatin, a protein that inhibits the growth of muscle tissue; it was developed to promote muscle growth.
- ACE-083, a TGF-β inhibitor, was developed to promote muscle growth.

Losmapimod, an oral inhibitor of p38α/β mitogen-activated protein kinases identified in cell-based screens as a suppressor of DUX4 expression, was the first DUX4-targeted drug to enter clinical testing. In a phase 2b trial (ReDUX4) in 80 adults, losmapimod did not significantly reduce DUX4-driven gene expression in muscle biopsies, the primary endpoint, but showed improvements in muscle fat infiltration on MRI, in reachable workspace (a measure of shoulder function), and in patient-reported global change compared with placebo. In the subsequent phase 3 REACH trial — the first phase 3 trial conducted in FSHD — 260 adults received losmapimod or placebo for 48 weeks. Losmapimod did not improve the primary endpoint of reachable workspace (a change of 0.013 versus 0.010 for placebo) or any secondary measure of muscle composition, strength, or quality of life; it was well tolerated. Its developer suspended further development in September 2024. The trial nonetheless generated one of the largest placebo-controlled datasets in FSHD, which has informed endpoint selection and patient stratification in later trials. After the program was suspended, the developer donated the clinical data and biospecimens from the phase 2 and phase 3 trials to the FSHD Society, a patient organization, which claims to make the datasets available to researchers and drug developers through its Global FSHD Innovation Hub subsidiary.

== Society and culture ==
=== Patient and research organizations ===
- The FSHD Society (named "FSH Society" until 2019) was founded in 1991 on the East Coast by two individuals with FSHD, Daniel Perez and Stephen Jacobsen. It has grown into the world's largest grassroots organization supporting people living with FSHD and their families, with a stated mission to find treatments and a cure for the condition. The organization claims to have co-written the MD-CARE Act of 2001 to secure federal funding for all muscular dystrophies. While the Society describes its early strategy as focused primarily on raising funding for seed grants, it states that its core strategy focuses on accelerating research breakthroughs, driving government advocacy, and organizing clinical trial networks and patient registries to mobilize the community for clinical trials and treatment readiness.
- The Global FSHD Innovation Hub is a wholly owned subsidiary of the FSHD Society that claims to support an industry collaborative in which companies partner in pre-competitive areas such as the development of biomarkers and clinical trial design.
- Friends of FSH Research is a research-oriented nonprofit organization founded in 2004 by Terry and Rick Colella from Kirkland, Washington, after their son was diagnosed with FSHD.
- The FSHD Global Research Foundation was founded in 2007 by Bill Moss in Australia, a former Macquarie Bank executive affected by FSHD. It is currently directed by Moss's daughter. It was named Australian charity of the year for 2017. It is the largest funder of FSHD medical research outside of the United States as of 2018.
- FSHD EUROPE was founded in 2010. Spanning multiple countries in Europe, it has launched the European Trial Network.

=== Social costs ===
Although FSHD is one of the most common muscular dystrophies, its costs to individuals and societies have been examined in only a few countries. Costs are both direct — medical care and, in advanced disease, ventilatory support, home care, and facility-based care — and indirect, chiefly lost productivity; unpaid care by family members is a further major component. Because weakness typically becomes apparent between the ages of 15 and 30, these costs arise during the years of education, employment, and family formation and accumulate over decades; estimates vary between countries as healthcare systems and prices differ.

Beyond medical care, the burden falls chiefly on employment and family life. In a Dutch survey, fewer than half of patients were participating in the workforce, about a quarter were permanently disabled, and nearly half of those still in paid work reported that health problems reduced their productivity at work; 42% received unpaid care from family members, on average more than 20 hours per week. The effects of informal caregiving on the caregivers themselves remain little studied in FSHD; studies of other chronic disabling disorders, including Duchenne muscular dystrophy and stroke, have found that informal caregivers experience physical strain and injuries, mental health problems, and financial hardship.

As in other progressive neuromuscular disorders, disease-related costs are high and increase with severity and clinical progression. In the Dutch survey, total annual costs were about twice as high for patients who needed a mobility aid, and more than four times as high for those unable to walk, as for patients walking without aids, with home care and unpaid family care the largest components; direct costs were about five times average health spending per person in the general population.

=== Media ===
- In the Amazon Video series The Man in the High Castle, Obergruppenführer John Smith's son, Thomas, is diagnosed with Landouzy–Dejerine syndrome.
- In the biography Stuart: A Life Backwards, the protagonist was affected by muscular dystrophy, presumably FSHD.
- Good Bad Things, an independent film about an entrepreneur afflicted with FSHD and his journey of transformation, self-acceptance and discovery. The movie premiered at the 2024 Slamdance Film Festival
- The Lost Voice, a short film featuring Tristram Ingham, who lives with FSHD. Ingham used Apple's Personal Voice feature to recreate his voice and use it to read a children's book titled The Lost Voice for International Day of Persons with Disabilities in 2023.

=== Notable cases ===
- Chip Wilson is a Canadian billionaire and founder of Lululemon. He has pledged 100 million Canadian dollars to research through the venture 'Solve FSHD'.
- Chris Carrino is the radio voice of the Brooklyn Nets. He founded the Chris Carrino Foundation for FSHD, oriented towards research funding.
- Madison Ferris is an American actress with FSHD who was the first wheelchair user to play a lead on Broadway.
- Morgan Hoffmann is an American professional golfer. He started the Morgan Hoffmann Foundation, oriented towards research funding.
- Arnold Gold (1925–2024) was a pediatric neurologist, founder of the Arnold P. Gold Foundation, and creator of white coat ceremonies. Gold focused on patient-centered care and humanism.
- Argyris Loizou is a Greek Cypriot slam poet, diagnosed with facioscapulohumeral muscular dystrophy at age 20. Loizou has twice won the national Slam Championship, writing about his experiences with the condition.

== Research directions ==
=== Pharmaceutical development ===
Timelapse of DUX4 expression in FSHD muscle cells

After achieving consensus on FSHD pathophysiology in 2014, researchers proposed four approaches for therapeutic intervention:

1. enhance the epigenetic repression of the D4Z4
2. target the DUX4 mRNA, including altering splicing or polyadenylation;
3. block the activity of the DUX4 protein
4. inhibit the DUX4-induced process, or processes, that lead to pathology.

In the 2020s, therapies targeting DUX4 mRNA became the most advanced, with one in phase 3 testing, and were joined by approaches that aim to regenerate muscle or reduce inflammation without acting on DUX4. No therapy has been approved for FSHD, and the first phase 3 trial, of the DUX4-expression inhibitor losmapimod, did not show benefit (see Past pharmaceutical development).

==== Suppressing DUX4 ====
RNA therapeutics designed to degrade DUX4 mRNA are the most advanced DUX4-directed approach. Antisense oligonucleotides, including chemically stabilized morpholinos and gapmers, reduce DUX4 and its effects in cell and animal models, but on their own they penetrate skeletal muscle poorly. To overcome this, small interfering RNAs (siRNAs) are being chemically linked to antibodies or antibody fragments that bind transferrin receptor 1, a receptor enriched on muscle cells, so that the siRNA reaches muscle after intravenous infusion.

- Delpacibart braxlosiran (del-brax), an antibody–siRNA conjugate, reduced DUX4-regulated gene expression in muscle biopsies by more than 50% on average in a phase 1/2 trial in 90 people, along with reductions in blood markers of muscle damage and trends toward improved muscle function; a phase 3 trial in about 200 people, measuring muscle strength and function over 78 weeks, is underway.
- SRP-1001 (formerly ARO-DUX4), another muscle-targeted siRNA, showed acceptable safety, delivery to muscle, and reduced creatine kinase in first-in-human testing.
- A third siRNA conjugate, DYNE-302, received regulatory clearance to begin phase 1 testing in 2026.
- MicroRNAs (miRNAs) directed against DUX4, delivered by viral vectors, have reduced DUX4, protected against muscle pathology, and prevented loss of grip strength in mouse FSHD models, and the endogenous microRNA miR-675 inhibits DUX4 in cell models.

Epigenetic re-silencing aims to restore the DNA methylation that normally keeps DUX4 switched off. EPI-321, a gene therapy given as a single intravenous infusion of an adeno-associated virus vector, carries a targeting system designed to re-methylate the D4Z4 repeat. In a first-in-human phase 1/2 study in 12 adults, interim results showed no serious adverse effects, biomarker changes consistent with DUX4 suppression, and increases in lean muscle volume on MRI at six months. Genome editing remains preclinical: an attempt to use CRISPR-Cas9 to knockout the DUX4 polyadenylation signal in cell models did not demonstrate therapeutic results, and genome-wide CRISPR screens have instead been used to identify candidate drug targets.

Among small molecule drugs which can typically be taken by ingestion rather than injection, the first direction tried was p38α/β MAP kinase inhibition. Losmapimod, the only p38 inhibitor to reach clinical testing in FSHD, did not show clinical benefit in phase 3; reviewers have noted that p38 inhibitors suppress DUX4 only partially and that the mechanism linking p38 kinase to DUX4 expression in mature muscle remains unknown. Work has since turned to other oral compounds. Clenbuterol — an oral β2-adrenergic agonist long used for lung disease, identified in screens of patient-derived cells as a DUX4 suppressor — is in an open-label phase 1 dose-finding study in 30 adults. Additional oral compounds that repress DUX4 expression or activity are in preclinical development.

==== Muscle regeneration ====
A separate strategy is to rebuild muscle without acting on DUX4. Myostatin is a protein that inhibits the growth of muscle tissue; antibodies that block its activation can increase lean muscle mass, an effect demonstrated in other neuromuscular diseases.

- Emugrobart (RO7204239), an antibody that binds latent myostatin, suppressed myostatin in a 52-week phase 2 trial in ambulatory adults with FSHD, but did not improve muscle volume or function compared with placebo, and further development for FSHD was stopped in 2026.
- Apitegromab, an antibody that inhibits the activation of pro-myostatin and improved motor function in phase 3 testing in spinal muscular atrophy, is being evaluated in a phase 2 trial in about 60 ambulatory adults with FSHD. The primary outcome is total lean muscle volume on whole-body MRI at one year; the second half of the trial adds a standardized at-home strength-training program.

Cell-based approaches — transplantation of muscle stem or progenitor cells intended to engraft and form new muscle fibers — are at an earlier, largely preclinical stage, with unsolved problems of engraftment, immune rejection, and long-term survival of transplanted cells.

==== Anti-inflammatory therapies ====
DUX4 expression is associated with chronic inflammation in muscle, and the inflammatory signaling molecule interleukin 6 correlates with disease severity. Satralizumab, an interleukin-6 receptor antagonist approved for neuromyelitis optica, is being tested in a 40-person phase 2 trial in FSHD1, intended to reduce muscle and systemic inflammation and the fibrofatty replacement of muscle.

==== Potential drug targets ====
- Inhibition of the hyaluronic acid (HA) pathway is a potential therapy. One study found that many DUX4-induced molecular pathologies are mediated by HA signaling, and inhibition of HA biosynthesis with 4-methylumbelliferone prevented these molecular pathologies.
- P300 inhibition has shown to inhibit the deleterious effects of DUX4
- BET inhibitors have been shown to reduce DUX4 expression.
- RIPK3-mediated cell death, which contributes to DUX4 toxicity in models.
- Antioxidants could potentially reduce the effects of FSHD. One study found that vitamin C, vitamin E, zinc gluconate, and selenomethionine supplementation increased endurance and strength of the quadriceps, but had no significant benefit on walking performance. Further study is warranted.

=== Clinical trial readiness ===
The growing number of potential treatments in clinical development has made trial infrastructure — sites, trained personnel, and patients ready to enroll — a goal in its own right. Because FSHD is rare, a trial typically has to recruit in many countries to meet its enrollment target, and each country applies its own clinical-trial regulations. Clinical researchers have organized themselves in international networks, including the FSHD Clinical Trial and Research Network (CTRN) in the United States and the FSHD European Trial Network in Europe; the European network's first workshop, held in 2021, worked towards trial readiness across Europe. An industry collaborative formed in 2026 to improve FSHD clinical-trial infrastructure.

National patient registries have become the usual channel for identifying and inviting eligible participants; a standardized core dataset allows patients to be selected by genotype and phenotype, and well-organized registries can also host the natural-history studies that validate outcome measures (see Outcome measures). Project Mercury, a patient-led initiative, aims to assemble a global cohort of 10,000 well-characterized patients who are ready for clinical trials.

=== Outcome measures ===
Ways of measuring the disease are important for studying disease progression and assessing the efficacy of drugs in clinical trials. Because FSHD progresses slowly and unevenly, strength and function measures change little over the one- to two-year duration of a typical trial. In a five-year natural history cohort, most commonly used clinical outcome assessments would have required trial durations longer than three years to detect a clinically important difference, assuming a drug at best slows progression, and trials based on them were considered unlikely to be feasible given the number of available patients.

These limitations were highlighted by the phase 3 REACH trial of losmapimod that failed to show efficacy (See Past pharmaceutical development). Investigators attributed this to placebo responses driven by participants' expectations—the positive phase 2 results were publicly known—and to learning effects on repeated functional testing, and noted that the 48-week duration may have been too short relative to the slow natural decline in the measure.

Biomarkers that reflect the underlying disease process are accordingly under development for FSHD clinical trials; a 2026 review proposed using them in layered combinations, with MRI to map active and inactive muscle, molecular signatures to confirm pathway engagement, and circulating readouts to enable frequent sampling. Expression signatures of DUX4 target genes in muscle biopsies provide evidence of target engagement in early-phase trials, and the DUX4-regulated plasma protein KHDC1L is under investigation as a minimally invasive, repeatable readout of DUX4 suppression. The review argued that future trials should separate evidence of target engagement from structural and functional outcomes, and select participants using MRI characteristics and emerging biomarkers.

Quantitative muscle MRI measures disease progression at the level of individual muscles. STIR/TIRM sequences detect muscle edema indicating active disease, and are used to select muscles for biopsy and to enrich trial populations with participants likely to progress, while Dixon imaging quantifies fat replacement; muscles with an intermediate baseline fat fraction are the most likely to progress, whereas minimally affected or end-stage muscles tend to remain stable over short intervals. A 2026 review of quantitative whole-body MRI concluded that one-size-fits-all functional endpoints can obscure change because task performance reflects musculoskeletal geometry and compensatory strategies as well as muscle pathology, and proposed muscle-informed, patient-specific trial designs that track an individual's at-risk muscles alongside paired functional tasks to improve sensitivity and statistical power; it also suggested that the MRI and functional endpoints of the losmapimod phase 3 trial may themselves have been limiting, noting that its MRI analysis covered a restricted set of muscles. Future directions include integrating whole-body MRI with motion capture and biomechanical models.

Additional measures:

- Reachable workspace uses the Kinect motion sensing system to compare the range of reach before and after a therapeutic clinical trial.
- The FSHD composite outcome measure (FSHD-COM) is an evaluator-administered composite of motor assessments reflecting whole-body function.
- Electrical impedance myography is being studied as a way to measure muscle damage.
- Quality of life can be measured with questionnaires, such as the FSHD Health Index. How the disease affects daily activities can be measured with questionnaires, such as the FSHD‐Rasch‐built overall disability scale (FSHD-RODS). Over 6.5 years of follow-up, the FSHD-RODS detected clinically important decline mainly in moderately to severely affected patients, suggesting that the ability to compensate for slowly progressive weakness limits the sensitivity of patient-reported measures over typical trial durations.
- Digital and wearable measures have shown promise for improving responsiveness and enabling remote assessment.

Clinical function and patient-reported measures nonetheless remain the basis for demonstrating a therapy's real-world benefit in late-phase trials, and international efforts (including the MOVE and ReSolve natural-history studies and initiatives like the ENMC FSHD outcomes workshop and the PaLaDIn project) are supporting working towards a consensus core outcome set and harmonized data collection.
