= FRG1 =

Protein-coding gene in the species Homo sapiens

Identifiers
- Aliases: FRG1, FRG1A, FSG1, FSHD region gene 1
- External IDs: OMIM: 601278; MGI: 893597; GeneCards: FRG1
Available structures
PDB	Ortholog search: PDBe RCSB
PDB	List of PDB id codes 2YUG

Gene location (Human)
Chr.	Chromosome 4 (human)
Band	4q35.2	Start	189,940,870 bp
Band	4q35.2	End	189,963,202 bp

Gene location (Mouse)
Chr.	Chromosome 8 (mouse)
Band	8 A4|8 23.89 cM	Start	41,850,496 bp
Band	8 A4|8 23.89 cM	End	41,870,111 bp
RNA expression pattern
Bgee	Human / Mouse (ortholog); Top expressed in: Achilles tendon; ganglionic eminence; monocyte; lymph node; ventricular zone; placenta; Descending thoracic aorta; smooth muscle tissue; tibial arteries; gastric mucosa / Top expressed in: granulocyte; blood; Gonadal ridge; medial ganglionic eminence; aortic valve; superior cervical ganglion; fossa; condyle; epiblast; otic placode; More reference expression data
BioGPS	n/a
Gene ontology
Molecular function	actin binding; protein binding; actin filament binding; RNA binding
Cellular component	cytoplasm; Cajal body; catalytic step 2 spliceosome; spliceosomal complex; Z discdkac; nucleus; striated muscle dense body; nucleolus
Biological process	rRNA processing; mRNA splicing, via spliceosome; muscle organ development; mRNA processing; ribosome biogenesis; RNA splicing
Sources:Amigo / QuickGO
Orthologs
Databases	NCBI: entry; OMA: entry
Species	Human	Mouse
Entrez	2483	14300
Ensembl	ENSG00000275145; ENSG00000283153; ENSG00000109536; ENSG00000283630	ENSMUSG00000031590
UniProt	Q14331	P97376
RefSeq (mRNA)	NM_004477	NM_013522
RefSeq (protein)	NP_004468	NP_038550
Location (UCSC)	Chr 4: 189.94 – 189.96 Mb	Chr 8: 41.85 – 41.87 Mb
PubMed search
- Wikidata
View/Edit Human	View/Edit Mouse

Protein FRG1 is an actin-bundling protein that in humans is encoded by the FRG1 gene.

This gene maps to a location 100 kb centromeric of the repeat units on chromosome 4q35 which are deleted in facioscapulohumeral muscular dystrophy (FSHD). It is evolutionarily conserved and has related sequences on multiple human chromosomes but DNA sequence analysis did not reveal any homology to known genes. In vivo studies demonstrate the encoded protein is localized to the nucleolus. Mice that overexpress FRG1 display facioscapulohumeral muscular dystrophy. Gabellili et al. suggest that human facioscapulohumeral muscular dystrophy results from overexpression of FRG1 in "skeletal muscle, which leads to abnormal alternative splicing of specific pre-mRNAs." This result has been replicated in tadpoles.
