= Losmapimod =

Chemical compound

Legal status
- Legal status: US: Investigational New Drug

Identifiers
- IUPAC name: 6-[5-(cyclopropylcarbamoyl)-3-fluoro-2-methylphenyl]-N-(2,2-dimethylpropyl)pyridine-3-carboxamide
- CAS Number: 585543-15-3
- PubChem CID: 11552706
- IUPHAR/BPS: 7835
- ChemSpider: 9727484
- UNII: F2DQF16BXE
- KEGG: D09639
- ChEMBL: ChEMBL1088752
- CompTox Dashboard (EPA): DTXSID30974109
- ECHA InfoCard: 100.158.124

Chemical and physical data
- Formula: C_{22}H_{26}FN_{3}O_{2}
- Molar mass: 383.467 g·mol^{−1}
- 3D model (JSmol): Interactive image
- SMILES: C3CC3NC(=O)c(cc(F)c1C)cc1-c(cc2)ncc2C(=O)NCC(C)(C)C
- InChI: InChI=1S/C22H26FN3O2/c1-13-17(9-15(10-18(13)23)21(28)26-16-6-7-16)19-8-5-14(11-24-19)20(27)25-12-22(2,3)4/h5,8-11,16H,6-7,12H2,1-4H3,(H,25,27)(H,26,28); Key:KKYABQBFGDZVNQ-UHFFFAOYSA-N

Losmapimod (GW856553X) is an investigational drug that reached stage III clinical trials for multiple medical conditions, but did not prove efficacy. It was most recently in development by Fulcrum Therapeutics for the treatment of facioscapulohumeral muscular dystrophy (FSHD). Losmapimod selectively inhibits enzymes p38α/β mitogen-activated protein kinases (MAPKs), which are modulators of DUX4 expression and mediators of inflammation.

== Historical Investigations ==
Losmapimod was discovered and unsuccessfully developed by GSK for treating multiple medical conditions. Despite failing to prove efficacy, GSK clinical trials showed that losmapimod is generally well tolerated across more than 3,500 subjects.

GSK investigated losmapimod as a therapeutic for patients post-myocardial infarction (heart attack). Despite phase II clinical trials the phase IIIA clinical trial (LATITUDE) failed to show significantly improved clinical outcomes. In October 2015 GSK announced cancelling the planned phase IIIB trial, but would "evaluate all options for future development."

GSK investigated losmapimod as a therapeutic for COPD, but multiple phase II clinical trials failed to show that losmapimod improves exercise tolerance, lung function, arterial inflammation, endothelial function, or rate of COPD exacerbations in subjects with COPD. GSK terminated development of losmapimod for COPD in 2016.

GSK investigated losmapimod as a therapeutic for major depressive disorder (MDD) on the basis of depression being correlated with elevated pro-inflammatory cytokines. Phase II clinical trials failed to show a significant improvement in depression symptoms and biomarkers.

In 2019 Fulcrum therapeutics acquired from GSK the rights to losmapimod. Fulcrum identified p38α/β MAPK inhibitors as potent suppressors of DUX4 expression, the de-suppression of which is accepted as the cause FSHD, and then chose to develop losmapimod for FSHD due to "substantial and attractive preclinical and clinical data" from previous GlaxoSmithKline (GSK) clinical trials. Although a 2021 phase IIb clinical trial showed slowing of muscle deterioration, a 2024 phase III clinical trial failed to demonstrate efficacy.
