= Reachable workspace =

Medical outcome measure

Reachable workspace is an outcome measure used in medicine to track disease progression in neuromuscular disorders that affect the upper extremities. It is defined as the space, relative to the torso, that an individual can reach by moving their upper extremities. It has been used in patients with duchenne muscular dystrophy (DMD) and facioscapulohumeral muscular dystrophy (FSHD).
