= Ligand-dependent nuclear receptor-interacting factor 1 =

Protein found in humans

LRIF1

Identifiers
- Aliases: LRIF1, C1orf103, RIF1, ligand dependent nuclear receptor interacting factor 1, HBiX1, FSHD3
- External IDs: OMIM: 615354; MGI: 2445214; GeneCards: LRIF1

Gene location (Human)
| Chr. | Chromosome 1 (human) |
| Band | 1p13.3 | Start | 110,947,190 bp |
| Band | 1p13.3 | End | 110,963,965 bp |

Gene location (Mouse)
| Chr. | Chromosome 3 (mouse) |
| Band | 3|3 F2.3 | Start | 106,592,303 bp |
| Band | 3|3 F2.3 | End | 106,643,893 bp |
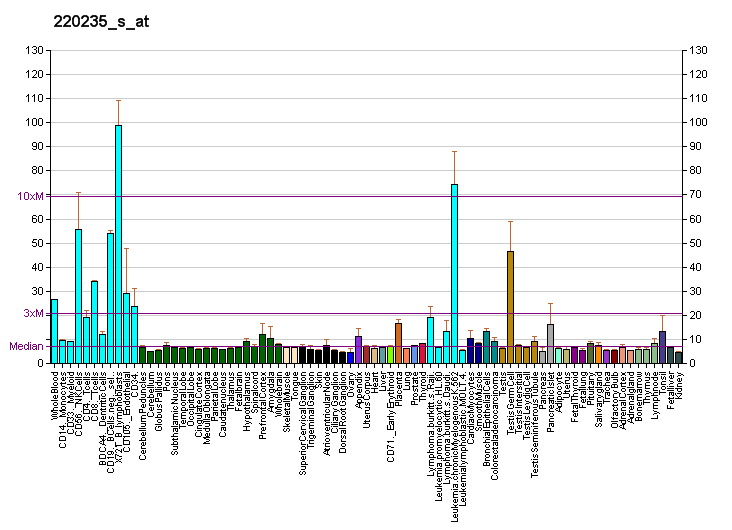
RNA expression pattern
| Bgee | Human / Mouse (ortholog); Top expressed in: Achilles tendon; gonad; testicle; Epithelium of choroid plexus; sperm; right testis; Skeletal muscle tissue of rectus abdominis; left testis; muscle of thigh; corpus epididymis / Top expressed in: spermatid; genital tubercle; spermatocyte; olfactory epithelium; granulocyte; seminiferous tubule; pineal gland; tail of embryo; superior cervical ganglion; spleen; More reference expression data |
| BioGPS | More reference expression data |
Gene ontology
| Molecular function | protein binding; retinoic acid receptor binding |
| Cellular component | nuclear matrix; nucleus; microtubule organizing center; Barr body; chromosome |
| Biological process | regulation of transcription, DNA-templated; transcription, DNA-templated; dosage compensation by inactivation of X chromosome |
Sources:Amigo / QuickGO
Orthologs
| Databases | NCBI: entry; OMA: entry |
| Species | Human | Mouse |
| Entrez | 55791 | 321000 |
| Ensembl | ENSG00000121931 | ENSMUSG00000056260 |
| UniProt | Q5T3J3 | Q8CDD9 |
| RefSeq (mRNA) | NM_001006945; NM_018372 | NM_001039478; NM_001039488; NM_001286685; NM_028081; NM_177309 |
| RefSeq (protein) | NP_001006946; NP_060842 | NP_001034567; NP_001034577; NP_001273614; NP_082357 |
| Location (UCSC) | Chr 1: 110.95 – 110.96 Mb | Chr 3: 106.59 – 106.64 Mb |
| PubMed search |
- Wikidata
| View/Edit Human | View/Edit Mouse |

Ligand-dependent nuclear receptor-interacting factor 1 (LRIF1) also known as receptor-interacting factor 1 (RIF1) is a protein that in humans is encoded by the LRIF1 gene.

LRIF1 has been shown to interact with SMCHD1 protein, mutation of which causes facioscapulohumeral muscular dystrophy type 2 (FSHD2). Mutation of LRIF1 itself has also been implicated in FSHD2.
