= Argyris Loizou =

- Born: 1979 (age 46–47); Manchester, United Kingdom
- Occupations: Slam poet, writer
- Writing career
- Notable works: "The Enlightenment of the Pot-Bellied Penguin", "A Meditation on the Shitshow"

Argyris Loizou is a Cypriot slam poet and writer. He is a two-time winner of the Cyprus National Poetry Slam and the first Cypriot to qualify for the World Poetry Slam Championship.

== Early life ==
Loizou was born in Manchester and grew up in Liverpool before moving to Larnaca, Cyprus, at the age of 15. He was diagnosed with facioscapulohumeral muscular dystrophy at 20, and later with Asperger’s syndrome.

== Career ==
He began performing at open-mic events in Larnaca and Nicosia around 2017 and soon became active in the island’s slam poetry scene. Loizou won the Cyprus National Poetry Slam in 2019 and 2021, and co-founded the poetry collective Πε’Τα!. He represented Cyprus at the European Poetry Slam Championship in Brussels, Belgium, placing seventh, and became the first Cypriot poet to qualify for the World Poetry Slam Championship.

== Themes ==
His work addresses disability, mental health, loneliness and connection. Pieces such as "The Enlightenment of the Pot-Bellied Penguin" and "A Meditation on the Shitshow" are his best known works.

== Personal life ==
Loizou lives in Larnaca.
