= Restriction fragment =

DNA fragment resulting from cleavage of DNA by a restriction enzyme

In molecular biology, a restriction fragment is a DNA fragment resulting from the cutting of a DNA strand by a restriction enzyme (restriction endonucleases). Each restriction enzyme is highly specific, recognising a particular short DNA sequence (a restriction site) and cutting both DNA strands at specific points within this site. Most restriction sites are palindromic (i.e. the sequence of nucleotides is the same on both strands when read in the 5' to 3' direction of each strand) and are four to eight nucleotides long. Many cuts are made by one restriction enzyme because of the chance repetition of these sequences in a long DNA molecule, yielding a set of restriction fragments. A particular DNA molecule will always yield the same set of restriction fragments when exposed to the same restriction enzyme. Restriction fragments can be analyzed using techniques such as gel electrophoresis or used in recombinant DNA technology.

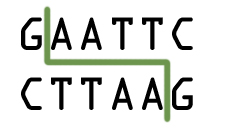
Illustration of typical restriction enzyme cleavage.

== Applications ==
In recombinant DNA technology, specific restriction endonucleases are used that will isolate a particular gene and cleave the sugar phosphate backbones at different points (retaining symmetry), so that the double-stranded restriction fragments have single-stranded ends. These short extensions, called sticky ends, can form hydrogen bonded base pairs with complementary sticky ends on any other DNA cut with the same enzyme (such as a bacterial plasmid).

In agarose gel electrophoresis, the restriction fragments yield a band pattern characteristic of the original DNA molecule and restriction enzyme used, for example the relatively small DNA molecules of viruses and plasmids can be identified simply by their restriction fragment patterns. If the nucleotide differences of two different alleles occur within the restriction site of a particular restriction enzyme, digestion of segments of DNA from individuals with different alleles for that particular gene with that enzyme would produce different fragments and that will each yield different band patterns in gel electrophoresis.
