= List of neuromuscular disorders =

Below is a partial list of neuromuscular disorders.

== Affecting muscle ==
=== Muscular dystrophies ===
==== Dystrophinopathies ====
- Duchenne muscular dystrophy
- Becker muscular dystrophy
- DMD-associated dilated cardiomyopathy

==== Limb girdle muscular dystrophies ====
Limb girdle muscular dystrophies (LGMD) as defined by the European Neuromuscular Centre in 2018. They are named by the following system: LGMD, recessive or dominant inheritance (R or D), order of discovery (number), affected protein.

- LGMD D1 DNAJB6-related
- LGMD D2 TNP03-related
- LGMD D3 HNRNPDL-related
- LGMD D4 calpain3-related
- LGMD D5 collagen 6-related
- LGMD R1 calpain3-related (Calpainopathy)
- LGMD R2 dysferlin-related
- LGMD R3 α-sarcoglycan-related
- LGMD R4 β-sarcoglycan-related
- LGMD R5 γ-sarcoglycan-related
- LGMD R6 δ-sarcoglycan-related
- LGMD R7 telethonin-related
- LGMD R8 TRIM 32-related
- LGMD R9 FKRP-related
- LGMD R10 titin-related
- LGMD R11 POMT1-related
- LGMD R12 anoctamin5-related
- LGMD R13 Fukutin-related
- LGMD R14 POMT2-related
- LGMD R15 POMGnT1-related
- LGMD R16 α-dystroglycan-related
- LGMD R17 plectin-related
- LGMD R18 TRAPPC11-related
- LGMD R19 GMPPB-related
- LGMD R20 ISPD-related
- LGMD R21 POGLUT1-related
- LGMD R22 collagen 6-related
- LGMD R23 laminin α2-related
- LGMD R24 POMGNT2-related

==== Congenital muscular dystrophies ====
- LAMA2-related (merosin deficient) congenital muscular dystrophy (Emery–Dreifuss muscular dystrophy)
- Collagen VI-related muscular dystrophy (Bethlem myopathy, Ullrich congenital muscular dystrophy)
- α-Dystroglycanopathies (Walker–Warburg syndrome, muscle-eye-brain disease)
- Laminopathies

==== Distal muscular dystrophy ====
Distal muscular dystrophy, also called distal myopathy, is essentially any muscle disease that preferentially affects the hands and/or feet, a much less common pattern than proximal muscle weakness.

- Late adult-onset type 1
- Late adult-onset type 2a
- Late adult-onset type 2b
- Early adult-onset type 1
- Early adult-onset type 2
- Early adult-onset type 3

==== Myofibrillar myopathy ====
Myofibrillar myopathies are diseases that cause similar findings of affected muscle when viewed under a microscope.

- Desminopathy
- Myotilinopathy
- Zaspopathy
- Filaminopathy
- Bag3opathy

==== Other muscular dystrophies ====
- Myotonic dystrophy
- Facioscapulohumeral muscular dystrophy
- Emery–Dreifuss muscular dystrophy (EDMD)

=== Congenital myopathies ===
- Nemaline myopathy
- Central core myopathy
- Centronuclear myopathy
- Congenital fiber type disproportion
- Multi/minicore myopathy
- Cylindrical spirals myopathy

=== Metabolic diseases ===
Mutations causing defects in metabolism can cause muscle damage due to inadequate energy for muscles or accumulation of waste products.

==== Mitochondrial myopathy ====
Mitochondrial myopathies are diseases caused by mutations related to mitochondria, and thus are generally inherited from the mother with variable expressivity due to heteroplasmy.

- Kearns–Sayre syndrome
- Mitochondrial encephalomyopathy, lactic acidosis, and stroke-like episodes (MELAS)
- Myoclonic epilepsy with ragged red fibers (MERRF)
- Cytochrome c oxidase (COX) deficiency
- Mitochondrial complex I deficiency
- Mitochondrial complex II deficiency
- Mitochondrial complex III deficiency (cytochrome b deficiency)
- mtDNA deletion

==== Glycogen storage disease ====
Glycogen storage diseases (GSD) are a group of diseases caused by mutations related to glycogen metabolism.

- GSD type II (Pompe disease)
- GSD type V (McArdle disease)
- GSD type VII (Tarui disease)
- GSD type XI (Lactate dehydrogenase deficiency)
- GSD type X (Phosphoglycerate mutase deficiency)
- Phosphoglycerate kinase deficiency

==== Fat oxidation defect ====
- Carnitine palmitoyltransferase I deficiency
- Carnitine palmitoyltransferase II deficiency
- Medium-chain acyl-coenzyme A dehydrogenase deficiency
- Long-chain 3-hydroxyacyl-coenzyme A dehydrogenase deficiency
- Very long-chain acyl-coenzyme A dehydrogenase deficiency

==== Other metabolic myopathies ====
- Myoadenylate deaminase (MADA) deficiency

=== Inflammatory myopathies ===
- Inclusion body myositis
- Dermatomyositis
- Polymyositis
- Statin-associated autoimmune myopathy

=== Other diseases of muscle ===
- Rippling muscle disease
- Drug-induced myopathy

== Affecting nerve ==
- Troyer syndrome
- Cramp fasciculation syndrome
- Hereditary spastic paraplegia
- Spinocerebellar ataxia
- Spinal and bulbar muscular atrophy

=== Neuronopathies ===
A neuronopathy affects the cell body of a nerve cell in the peripheral nervous system.

- Amyotrophic lateral sclerosis
- Spinal muscular atrophy
- Spinal muscular atrophy with respiratory distress type 1
- Atypical motor neuron diseases
- Dorsal root ganglion disorders

=== Neuropathy ===
A neuropathy affects the peripheral nerves.

- Guillain–Barré syndrome
- Charcot–Marie–Tooth disease
- Chemotherapy-induced peripheral neuropathy

==== Compressive (entrapment) neuropathies ====
===== Upper extremity =====
- Median neuropathy at wrist (carpal tunnel syndrome)
- Proximal median neuropathy
- Ulnar neuropathy at elbow
- Ulnar neuropathy at wrist
- Radial neuropathy
  - at the spiral groove
  - in the axilla
  - superficial radial sensory neuropathy
- posterior interosseous neuropathy
- Suprascapular neuropathy
- Axillary neuropathy
- Musculocutaneous neuropathy
- Long thoracic neuropathy

===== Lower extremity =====
- deep peroneal mononeuropathy at the fibular neck
- common fibular mononeuropathy at the hip
- deep fibular mononeuropathy at the ankle
- superficial fibular mononeuropathy
- sciatic mononeuroapthy at the hip or thigh
- piriformis syndrome
- proximal tibial mononeuropathy
- tarsal tunnel syndrome
- interdigital neuropathy (Morton's Neuroma)
- sural mononeuropathy
- femoral mononeuropathy
- saphenous mononeuropathy
- lateral femoral cutaneous neuropathy
- ilioinguinal neuropathy
- iliohypogastric neuropathy
- genitofemoral neuropathy
- posterior femoral cutaneous neuropathy
- obturator neuropathy
- neuropathy of gluteal nerves

==== Cranial nerve palsies ====
- trigeminal nerve
  - trigeminal neuralgia
  - trigeminal sensory neuropathy
  - numb chin syndrome
  - numb cheek syndrome
  - herpes simplex virus infection
- facial nerve
  - bell's palsy
  - bilateral facial palsy
  - congenital (trauma, Mobius syndrome, cardiofacial syndrome)
- glossopharyngeal nerve
  - glossopharyngeal neuralgia
  - glomus jugulare tumor
- vagus nerve injury
- spinal accessory nerve palsy
- hypoglossal nerve injury

== Affecting neuromuscular junction ==
- Myasthenia gravis
- Congenital myasthenic syndrome
- Lambert–Eaton myasthenic syndrome
- Isaac's syndrome

== Other ==
- Multiple sclerosis
- Peripheral nerve tumor
- Stiff-person syndrome
