= Integrin alpha 7 =

ITGA7

Identifiers
- Aliases: ITGA7, integrin subunit alpha 7
- External IDs: OMIM: 600536; MGI: 102700; GeneCards: ITGA7

Gene location (Human)
Chr.	Chromosome 12 (human)
Band	12q13.2	Start	55,684,568 bp
Band	12q13.2	End	55,716,404 bp

Gene location (Mouse)
Chr.	Chromosome 10 (mouse)
Band	10 D3|10 77.2 cM	Start	128,769,687 bp
Band	10 D3|10 77.2 cM	End	128,794,151 bp
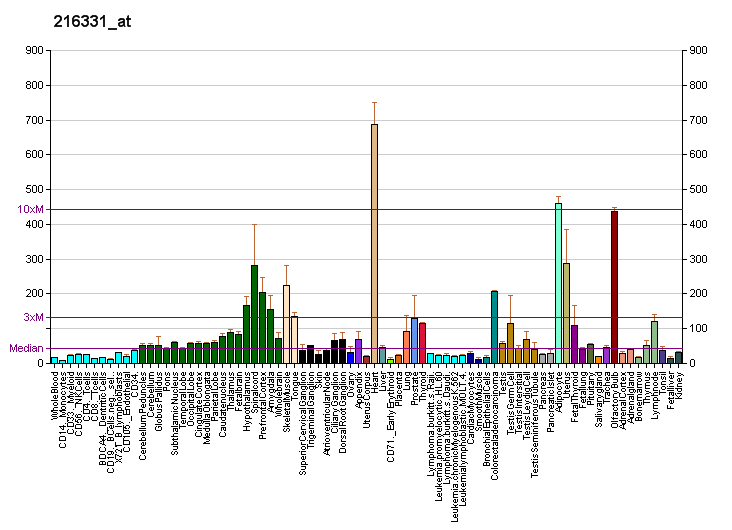

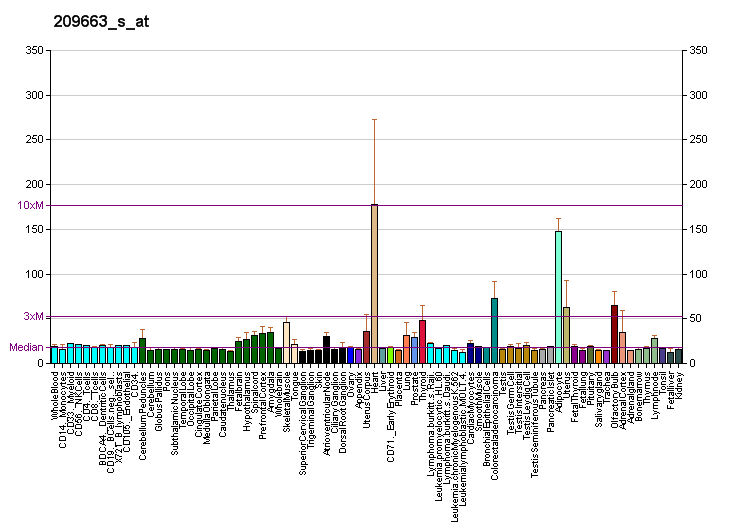
RNA expression pattern
Bgee	Human / Mouse (ortholog); Top expressed in: apex of heart; right coronary artery; Descending thoracic aorta; right auricle of heart; ascending aorta; saphenous vein; popliteal artery; tibial arteries; left ventricle; left coronary artery / Top expressed in: lumbar spinal ganglion; muscle of thigh; ankle; outer renal medulla; inner stripe of outer renal medulla; external carotid artery; lip; striated muscle tissue; skeletal muscle tissue; myocardium of ventricle; More reference expression data
BioGPS	More reference expression data
Gene ontology
Molecular function	protein binding; metal ion binding
Cellular component	integral component of membrane; cell surface; integrin complex; plasma membrane; membrane
Biological process	integrin-mediated signaling pathway; heterotypic cell-cell adhesion; muscle organ development; cell-matrix adhesion; extracellular matrix organization; cell adhesion; endodermal cell differentiation; regulation of cell shape
Sources:Amigo / QuickGO
Orthologs
Databases	NCBI: entry; OMA: entry
Species	Human	Mouse
Entrez	3679	16404
Ensembl	ENSG00000135424	ENSMUSG00000025348
UniProt	Q13683	Q61738
RefSeq (mRNA)	NM_001144996; NM_001144997; NM_002206; NM_001367993; NM_001367994 NM_001374465	NM_008398; NM_001330160
RefSeq (protein)	NP_001138468; NP_001138469; NP_002197; NP_001354922; NP_001354923 NP_001361394	n/a
Location (UCSC)	Chr 12: 55.68 – 55.72 Mb	Chr 10: 128.77 – 128.79 Mb
PubMed search
- Wikidata
View/Edit Human	View/Edit Mouse

Alpha-7 integrin is a protein that in humans is encoded by the ITGA7 gene. Alpha-7 integrin is critical for modulating cell-matrix interactions. Alpha-7 integrin is highly expressed in cardiac muscle, skeletal muscle and smooth muscle cells, and localizes to Z-disc and costamere structures. Mutations in ITGA7 have been associated with congenital myopathies and noncompaction cardiomyopathy, and altered expression levels of alpha-7 integrin have been identified in various forms of muscular dystrophy.

== Structure ==
ITGA7 encodes the protein alpha-7 integrin. Alpha-7 integrin is 128.9 kDa in molecular weight and 1181 amino acids in length. Integrins are heterodimeric integral membrane proteins composed of an alpha chain and a beta chain. Alpha-7 integrin undergoes post-translational cleavage within the extracellular domain to yield disulfide-linked light and heavy chains that join with beta 1 to form an integrin that binds to the extracellular matrix protein laminin-1. The primary binding partners of alpha-7 integrin are laminin-1 (alpha1-beta1-gamma1), laminin-2 (alpha2-beta1-gamma1) and laminin-4 (alpha2-beta2-gamma1). Alpha-7/beta-1 is the major integrin complex expressed in differentiated muscle cells.

Splice variants of alpha-7 integrin that differ in both the extracellular and cytoplasmic domains exist in the mouse and are developmentally regulated in mouse and rat muscle tissue. The X1/X2 alternative splicing region lies in the extracellular domain and alters the ligand binding site; specifically, the conserved homology repeat domains 3 and 4. The first identified human transcript contains extracellular and cytoplasmic domains corresponding to the mouse X2 and B variants, respectively. A unique extracellular splice variant was also identified in human. The differentially spliced variants detected in rodents have also been detected in humans. Major cytoplasmic, developmentally regulated variants, alpha-7A and alpha-7B, as well as extracellular variants, X1 and X2 were identified in humans. Moreover, the D variant, but not the C variant was detected in humans.

Alpha-7 integrin is highly expressed in striated muscle, namely skeletal and cardiac muscle, and functions as the major laminin-binding integrin. It was later shown that alpha-7 integrin is also highly expressed in smooth muscle. The two major splice variants of alpha-7 integrin appear to have developmentally regulated expression; alpha-7A integrin is expressed solely in skeletal muscle, however alpha-7B integrin is expressed more loosely in striated muscle as well as the vasculature.

== Function ==
The function of alpha-7 integrin, as is the case for most integrins is to mediate cell membrane interactions with extracellular matrix.

The alpha-7/beta-1 integrin complex clearly plays a role in the development of striated muscle and smooth muscle. Alpha-7/beta-1 integrin promotes the adhesion and motility of myoblasts, and is likely important in the recruitment of myogenic precursors during muscle differentiation. It was shown however that beta-1D integrin appears at embryonic day 11 and alpha-7 integrin does not appear until embryonic day 17; thus, beta-1D associates with alternate alpha subunits (alpha-5, alpha-6A) prior to alpha-7. In human skeletal muscle, alpha-7 integrin is also developmentally regulated, being first detected at age 2.

In adult striated muscle cells, alpha-7 integrin (complexed to beta-1 integrin) is localized to Z-discs and costamere structures, bound to the four and one half LIM domain proteins, FHL1 and FHL2. It has been demonstrated that alpha-7 integrin can be mono-ADP-ribosylated on the cell surface in skeletal muscle cells; however, the functional significance of this modification has not been investigated.

Insights into the function of alpha-7 integrin have come from studies employing mouse transgenesis. A mouse expressing a null allele of the ITGA7 gene are viable, suggesting that alpha-7 integrin is not essential for normal myogenesis; however, these mice develop a phenotype that resembles muscular dystrophy. In soleus muscle, there was a significant disruption of myotendinous junctions, variation in the size of fibers, centrally located nuclei, necrosis, phagocytosis, and elevated serum levels of creatine kinase. It has also been proposed that alpha-7 integrin and gamma-sarcoglycan have overlapping functions in skeletal muscle. In support of this, a double knockout of gamma-sarcoglycan and alpha-7 integrin produced a phenotype that was far worse than either knockout alone. Mice died within 1 month of birth and had severe muscle degeneration, suggesting that the roles of these proteins may overlap to maintain the stability of the sarcolemma. Moreover, the double knockout of dystrophin and alpha-7 integrin produced a Duchenne muscular dystrophy-like phenotype, and demonstrated that alterations in alpha-7 integrin affect the pathological changes observed in dystrophin deficiencies. In support of this notion, AAV overexpression of ITGA7 in skeletal muscle of Duchenne muscular dystrophy (DMD) mice showed a significant protective effect against adverse functional parameters associated with DMD, combined with a reversal of these negative features, suggesting that alpha-7 integrin may be a potential therapeutic candidate to treat Duchenne muscular dystrophy.

Studies employing mutant alpha-7 integrin constructs have shown that the cytoplasmic tail of alpha-7B integrin is essential for regulation of lamellipodia formation and regulation of cell mobility regulation via laminin-1/E8 and p130(CAS)/Crk complex formation.

== Clinical significance ==
Mutations in ITGA7 have been found in patients with unclassified congenital myopathy. Additionally, in patients with severe congenital fiber type disproportion and left ventricular non-compaction cardiomyopathy, a missense mutation, Glu882Lys, was identified in ITGA7 along with a missense mutation in MYH7B, both novel disease genes having a synergistic effect on disease severity.

Alpha-7B integrin expression has been shown to be significantly decreased at sarcolemmal membranes in patients with laminin alpha2 chain-deficient congenital muscular dystrophy. Additionally, in Duchenne muscular dystrophy and Becker muscular dystrophy, the expression of alpha-7B integrin was enhanced.

== Interactions ==
ITGA7 has been shown to interact with:

- Merosin
- ITGB1
- FHL2 and
- FHL3.

== See also ==
- Congenital muscular dystrophy
