= Perimyositis =

- Specialty: Rheumatology

Perimyositis is inflammation of the connective tissue around a muscle.

== See also ==
- myopathy (muscle disease)
- myalgia (muscle pain)
- Masticatory muscle myositis (a disease in dogs)
- myositis
