= Myositis =

Inflammation of skeletal muscle

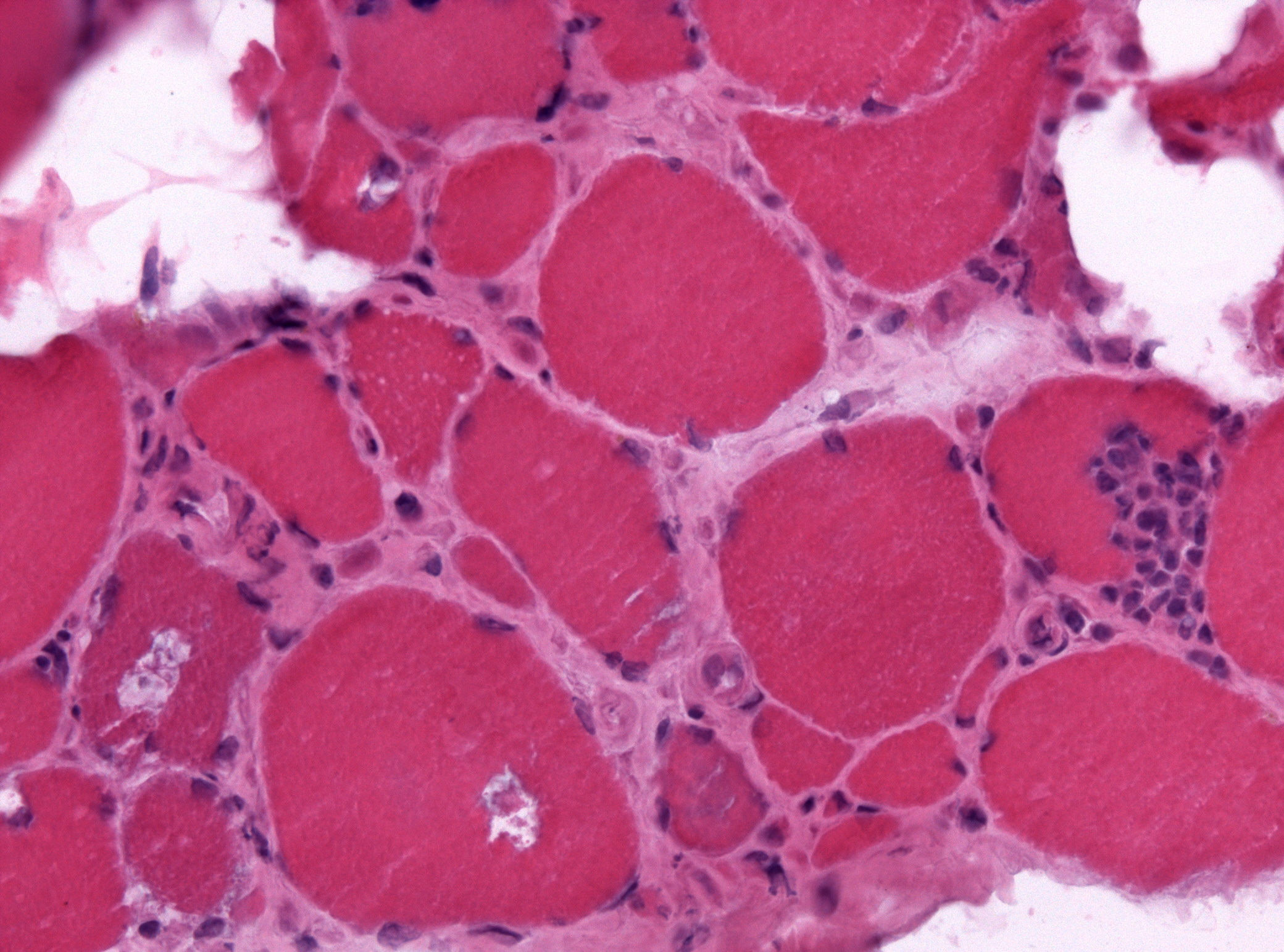
- A muscle biopsy from someone who is diagnosed with myositis.
- Specialty: Rheumatology
- Complications: Amplified musculoskeletal pain syndrome
- Causes: Autoimmunity, idiopathic, adverse drug reaction

Myositis is a rarely encountered medical condition characterized by inflammation affecting the muscles. The manifestations of this condition may include skin issues, muscle weakness, and the potential involvement of other organs. Additionally, systemic symptoms like weight loss, fatigue, and low-grade fever can manifest in individuals with myositis.

== Causes ==
Myositis can arise from various causes, including injury, certain medications, infections, inherited muscle disorders, or autoimmune conditions. In some instances, the origins of myositis remain idiopathic, without a discernible cause.

- Injury: A mild form of myositis can occur with hard exercise. A more severe form of muscle injury, called rhabdomyolysis, is also associated with myositis. This is a condition where an injury to the patient's muscles causes them to quickly break down.
- Medicines: A variety of different medicines can cause myositis. One of the most common types of drugs that can cause myositis are statins, which are used to lower cholesterol levels. One of the most common side effects of statin therapy is muscle pain which, more rarely, can lead to myositis.
- Infection: The most common infectious cause of myositis is viral infections, such as the common cold. Other viruses, such as COVID-19, are also shown to be a rare cause of myositis. Benign acute childhood myositis has been described in children after prodromal viral infections with different viral agents. Bacterial, parasitic, and fungal infections are other infectious causes of myositis.
- Inherited muscle disease: Many inherited myopathies may have secondary myositis, including calpainopathy, dysferlinopathy, facioscapulohumeral muscular dystrophy, dystrophinopathy, and LMNA-associated myopathy.
- Autoimmune: Autoimmune disease is an abnormal immune response to specific body protein or other biomolecular target, such as one of the muscles. The three main types of idiopathic myositis (known as inflammatory myopathies) that typically test positive for autoantibodies are dermatomyositis, polymyositis, and inclusion body myositis. Other autoimmune diseases, such as systemic lupus erythematosus, can also cause myositis-like symptoms.

== Diagnosis ==
There are various tools that can be used to help diagnose myositis. The most common methods are physical examination, electromyography (EMG), magnetic resonance imaging (MRI), muscle biopsy, and blood tests. The first course of action a doctor will likely take is perform a physical exam. The doctor assesses for muscle weakness or rashes.

Another possible test is electromyography. This test involves the insertion of small needles into the patient's muscles. This allows a physician to look at the muscles' responses to various electrical nerve stimuli and evaluate which muscles potentially have myositis. Magnetic resonance imaging can be useful in diagnosis, allowing painless, non-invasive visualisation of any muscle wastage.

Muscle biopsies, however, are the most reliable tests for diagnosing myositis.

There are also a variety of blood tests available that help in the diagnosis of myositis. The doctor may look for an elevation of creatine kinase in the blood, which is indicative of muscle inflammation. Certain autoantibodies (antibodies that target muscle cells) can also be found in the blood, which can indicate that myositis is caused by an autoimmune disease. Some specific examples of autoantibodies are Anti-Jo-1, Anti-HMGCR, Anti-TIF1, etc.

== Treatment ==
Treatment for myositis depends on the underlying cause. For myositis, which is caused by a viral infection, no treatment is typically needed. For myositis caused by a bacterial infection, antibiotics can be used. For myositis caused by a medication, it is important to stop using that medication.

There are a variety of treatment options available if myositis is caused by an autoimmune disease. Glucocorticoids are often the first choice for treatment. This drug works to weaken the immune system so that it is not able to attack the muscles. It is a type of steroid and can cause a wide array of side effects, such as mood changes, increased hunger, trouble sleeping, etc. Another treatment option is a steroid-sparing immunosuppressive agent. This also works to weaken the immune system but does not cause the side effects that steroids do. Another treatment option is a class of drugs called biologics. Also, intravenous immunoglobulins (IVIg) have been shown to be effective in the treatment of myositis caused by an autoimmune disease.

== See also ==
- Benign acute childhood myositis
- Inflammatory myopathies
- Myopathy (muscle disease)
- Myalgia (muscle pain)
- Masticatory muscle myositis (a disease in dogs)
- Perimyositis
- Sarcoidosis § Bones, joints, and muscles
