= Dermatopolymyositis =

- Other names: PM/DM
- Specialty: Rheumatology

Dermatopolymyositis is a family of myositis disorders that includes polymyositis and dermatomyositis. As such, it includes both a distinctive skin rash and progressive muscular weakness. It is a rare disease.
