= Dental combination syndrome =

Combination syndrome, also known as anterior hyperfunction syndrome

Dental combination syndrome (DCS) is a condition that occurs when an individual's bite is compromised due to multiple missing teeth, worn teeth, or tooth fractures. It is a complex dental issue that requires a comprehensive approach to diagnosis and treatment.

== Diagnosis ==
DCS can be diagnosed through a comprehensive dental examination that includes a thorough medical history, dental X-rays, and a clinical evaluation of the teeth, gums, and surrounding structures. The use of advanced diagnostic tools, such as cone beam computed tomography (CBCT), can also help in the accurate diagnosis of DCS.

== Symptoms ==
DCS can cause a range of symptoms, including jaw pain, headaches, tooth sensitivity, and difficulty chewing. These symptoms can be intermittent or constant and can significantly impact an individual's quality of life.

== Causes ==
DCS is caused by a combination of factors that lead to an imbalance in the bite. These factors can include multiple missing teeth, worn teeth due to bruxism (teeth grinding), tooth fractures, and other dental issues that affect the alignment and function of the teeth and jaw.

== Treatment ==
The treatment of DCS requires a comprehensive approach that addresses the underlying causes of the condition. This can include the restoration of missing teeth, the use of dental appliances to correct the bite, and the management of any underlying dental issues that contribute to the condition. The use of neuromuscular dentistry techniques can also help in the accurate diagnosis and treatment of DCS.

== Prevention ==
DCS can be prevented by maintaining good oral hygiene practices, addressing dental issues promptly, and seeking regular dental checkups. The use of dental appliances, such as mouthguards, can also help prevent tooth wear due to bruxism.

In summary, DCS is a complex dental condition that can significantly impact an individual's quality of life. It requires a comprehensive approach to diagnosis and treatment, and preventative measures can also be taken to reduce the risk of developing the condition.
