= Myopathy =

Muscular disease in which the muscle fibers do not function correctly

- Other names: Muscle disease
- Specialty: Rheumatology, Neuromuscular medicine

In medicine, myopathy is a disease of the muscle in which the muscle fibers do not function properly. Myopathy means muscle disease (Greek : myo- muscle + patheia -pathy : suffering). This meaning implies that the primary defect is within the muscle, as opposed to the nerves ("neuropathies" or "neurogenic" disorders) or elsewhere (e.g., the brain).

This muscular defect typically results in myalgia (muscle pain), muscle weakness (reduced muscle force), or premature muscle fatigue (initially normal, but declining muscle force). Muscle cramps, stiffness, spasm, and contracture can also be associated with myopathy. Myopathy experienced over a long period (chronic) may result in the muscle becoming an abnormal size, such as muscle atrophy (abnormally small) or a pseudoathletic appearance (abnormally large).

Capture myopathy can occur in wild or captive animals, such as deer and kangaroos, and leads to morbidity and mortality. It usually occurs as a result of stress and physical exertion during capture and restraint.

Muscular disease can be classified as neuromuscular or musculoskeletal in nature. Different myopathies may be inherited, infectious, non-communicable, or idiopathic (cause unknown). The disease may be isolated to affecting only muscle (pure myopathy), or may be part of a systemic disease as is typical in mitochondrial myopathies.

== Signs and symptoms ==
Common symptoms include muscle weakness, cramps, stiffness, and tetany.

== Diagnosis ==
The evaluation of a suspected myopathy combines clinical assessment with laboratory, electrophysiological, imaging, histological and genetic testing, since no single test is diagnostic for all forms.

=== Laboratory tests ===
Serum creatine kinase (CK) is the most commonly used biomarker of muscle injury, and is often supplemented by aldolase, lactate dehydrogenase and the aminotransferases. However, elevated CK is not specific to myopathy, and isolated raised CK ("hyperCKemia") has a poor diagnostic yield on its own. Where an idiopathic inflammatory myopathy is suspected, testing for myositis-specific autoantibodies (MSAs) is recommended, ideally before starting immunosuppression, as these antibodies define distinct clinical subtypes and patterns of organ involvement.

=== Electrodiagnostic testing ===
Electromyography (EMG) and nerve conduction studies help distinguish myopathic from neurogenic causes of weakness and may show characteristic myopathic motor unit potentials or myotonic discharges. A myopathic EMG combined with proximal weakness and hyperCKemia substantially increases the likelihood of a positive muscle biopsy, although a normal EMG does not exclude myopathy.

=== Imaging ===
Magnetic resonance imaging of muscle can assess deep muscles not readily sampled by EMG, identify subclinical involvement, characterise patterns of muscle edema and fatty replacement, and guide the selection of a biopsy site.

=== Muscle biopsy ===
Muscle biopsy with histological, histochemical and immunohistochemical analysis remains a cornerstone for confirming inflammatory and structural myopathies and for excluding non-inflammatory causes. Its diagnostic value depends on patient selection, being highest when hyperCKemia, proximal weakness and a myopathic EMG are all present.

=== Genetic testing ===
For inherited myopathies and muscular dystrophies, molecular genetic testing of peripheral blood, increasingly via next-generation sequencing panels, can confirm the diagnosis and often removes the need for muscle biopsy. Genetic testing is now recommended as a first-tier investigation in selected presentations such as unprovoked rhabdomyolysis, where it frequently identifies an underlying myopathy even when EMG and biopsy are unremarkable.

== Pathophysiology ==
Myopathies share a final common feature of impaired skeletal muscle fibre function, but arise through diverse mechanisms that underpin their classification. In the inherited myopathies, pathogenic variants disrupt structural proteins of the muscle membrane and cytoskeleton (as in the muscular dystrophies), ion channels (the channelopathies and myotonias), or the enzymes of muscle energy metabolism. Contemporary classification frameworks increasingly integrate the underlying genotype and pathomechanism alongside the clinical phenotype.

In metabolic myopathies, defects affecting glycogen, lipid or mitochondrial metabolism impair the production of adenosine triphosphate (ATP) within the muscle cell, so that symptoms are often dynamic and precipitated by exertion rather than static. In the idiopathic inflammatory myopathies, immune-mediated injury produces endomysial inflammation, and the predominant immunopathology differs between subtypes, supporting a clinico-sero-pathological classification into dermatomyositis, polymyositis, immune-mediated necrotising myopathy, anti-synthetase/overlap myositis and inclusion-body myositis. Acquired myopathies of systemic disease similarly act through distinct routes, including endocrine dysregulation, drug and toxin exposure, critical illness and paraneoplastic mechanisms.

== Systemic diseases ==
Myopathies in systemic disease results from several different disease processes including endocrine, inflammatory, paraneoplastic, infectious, drug- and toxin-induced, critical illness myopathy, metabolic, collagen-related, and myopathies with other systemic disorders. Patients with systemic myopathies often present acutely or subacutely. On the other hand, familial myopathies or dystrophies generally present in a chronic fashion with exceptions of metabolic myopathies, in which symptoms on occasion can be precipitated acutely. Metabolic myopathies, which affect the production of ATP within the muscle cell, typically present with dynamic (exercise-induced) rather than static symptoms. Most of the inflammatory myopathies can have a chance association with malignant lesion; the incidence appears to be specifically increased only in patients with dermatomyositis.

There are many types of myopathy. ICD-10 codes are provided here where available.

=== Inherited forms ===
- (G71.0) Dystrophies (or muscular dystrophies) are a subgroup of myopathies characterized by muscle degeneration and regeneration. Clinically, muscular dystrophies are typically progressive, because the muscles' ability to regenerate is eventually lost, leading to progressive weakness and often leading to use of a wheelchair and eventually death, usually related to respiratory weakness.
- (G71.1) Myotonia
  - Neuromyotonia
- (G71.2) The congenital myopathies do not show evidence for either a progressive dystrophic process (i.e., muscle death) or inflammation, but instead characteristic microscopic changes are seen in association with reduced contractile ability of the muscles. Congenital myopathies include, but are not limited to:
  - (G71.2) nemaline myopathy (characterized by presence of "nemaline rods" in the muscle),
  - (G71.2) multi/minicore myopathy (characterized by multiple small "cores" or areas of disruption in the muscle fibers),
  - (G71.2) centronuclear myopathy (or myotubular myopathy) (in which the nuclei are abnormally found in the center of the muscle fibers), a rare muscle wasting disorder.
- (G71.3) Mitochondrial myopathies, which are due to defects in mitochondria, which provide a critical source of energy for muscle
- (G72.3) Familial periodic paralysis
- (G72.4) Inflammatory myopathies, which are caused by problems with the immune system attacking components of the muscle, leading to signs of inflammation in the muscle
- (G73.6) Metabolic myopathies, which result from defects in biochemical metabolism that primarily affect muscle
  - (G73.6/E74.0) Glycogen storage diseases, which may affect muscle
  - (G73.6/E75) Lipid storage disorder
- (G72.89) Other myopathies
  - Brody myopathy
  - Congenital myopathy with abnormal subcellular organelles
  - Fingerprint body myopathy
  - Inclusion body myopathy 2
  - Megaconial myopathy
  - Myofibrillar myopathy
  - Rimmed vacuolar myopathy

=== Acquired ===
- (G72.0 - G72.2) External substance induced myopathy
  - (G72.0) Drug-induced myopathy
    - Glucocorticoid myopathy is caused by this class of steroids increasing the breakdown of the muscle proteins leading to muscle atrophy.
  - (G72.1) Alcoholic myopathy
  - (G72.2) Myopathy due to other toxic agents, including atypical myopathy in horses caused by toxins in sycamore seeds and seedlings.
- (M33.0-M33.1)
  - Dermatomyositis produces muscle weakness and skin changes. The skin rash is reddish and most commonly occurs on the face, especially around the eyes, and over the knuckles and elbows. Ragged nail folds with visible capillaries can be present. It can often be treated by drugs like corticosteroids or immunosuppressants. (M33.2)
  - Polymyositis produces muscle weakness. It can often be treated by drugs like corticosteroids or immunosuppressants.
  - Inclusion body myositis is a slowly progressive disease that produces weakness of hand grip and straightening of the knees. No effective treatment is known.
- (M60.9) Benign acute childhood myositis
- (M61) Myositis ossificans
- (M62.89) Rhabdomyolysis and (R82.1) myoglobinurias

The Food and Drug Administration is recommending that physicians restrict prescribing high-dose simvastatin (Zocor, Merck) to patients, given an increased risk of muscle damage. The FDA drug safety communication stated that physicians should limit using the 80-mg dose unless the patient has already been taking the drug for 12 months and there is no evidence of myopathy. "Simvastatin 80 mg should not be started in new patients, including patients already taking lower doses of the drug," the agency states.

- Statin-associated autoimmune myopathy

=== Myocardium / cardiomyopathy ===
- (I40) Acute myocarditis
- (I41) Myocarditis in diseases classified elsewhere
- (I42) Cardiomyopathy
  - (I42.0) Dilated cardiomyopathy
  - (I42.1) Obstructive hypertrophy cardiomyopathy
  - (I42.2) Other hypertrophic cardiomyopathy
  - (I42.3) Endomyocardial (eosinophilic) disease
    - Eosinophilic myocarditis
    - Endomyocardial (tropical) fibrosis
    - Löffler's endocarditis
  - (I42.4) Endocardial fibroelastosis
  - (I42.5) Other restrictive cardiomyopathy
  - (I42.6) Alcoholic cardiomyopathy
  - (I42.8) Other cardiomyopathies
    - Arrhythmogenic right ventricular dysplasia
- (I43) Cardiomyopathy in diseases classified elsewhere

=== Differential diagnosis ===
At birth

- None as systemic causes; mainly hereditary

Onset in childhood

- Inflammatory myopathies: dermatomyositis, polymyositis (rarely)
- Infectious myopathies
- Endocrine and metabolic disorders: hypokalemia, hypocalcemia, hypercalcemia

Onset in adulthood

- Inflammatory myopathies: polymyositis, dermatomyositis, inclusion body myositis, viral (HIV)
- Infectious myopathies
- Endocrine myopathies: thyroid, parathyroid, adrenal, pituitary disorders
- Toxic myopathies: alcohol, corticosteroids, narcotics, colchicines, chloroquine
- Critical illness myopathy
- Metabolic myopathies
- Paraneoplastic myopathy

== Treatments ==
Because different types of myopathies are caused by many different pathways, there is no single treatment for myopathy. Treatments range from treatment of the symptoms to very specific cause-targeting treatments. Drug therapy, physical therapy, bracing for support, surgery, and massage are all current treatments for a variety of myopathies.
