= FHL2 =

Protein-coding gene in the species Homo sapiens

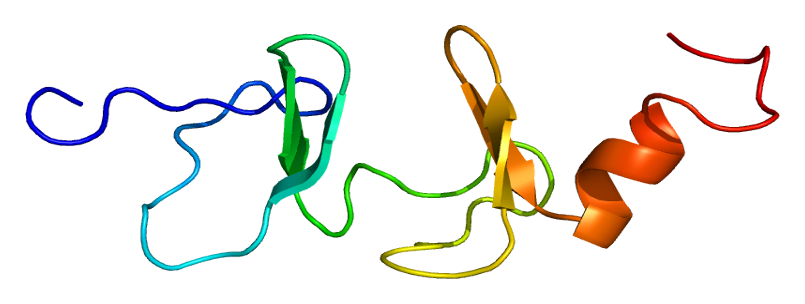

Identifiers
- Aliases: FHL2, AAG11, DRAL, FHL-2, SLIM-3, SLIM3, four and a half LIM domains 2
- External IDs: OMIM: 602633; MGI: 1338762; GeneCards: FHL2
Available structures
| PDB | Ortholog search: PDBe RCSB |
| PDB | List of PDB id codes 1X4K, 1X4L, 2D8Z, 2MIU |

Gene location (Human)
| Chr. | Chromosome 2 (human) |
| Band | 2q12.2 | Start | 105,357,712 bp |
| Band | 2q12.2 | End | 105,438,513 bp |

Gene location (Mouse)
| Chr. | Chromosome 1 (mouse) |
| Band | 1|1 C1.1 | Start | 43,162,234 bp |
| Band | 1|1 C1.1 | End | 43,236,144 bp |
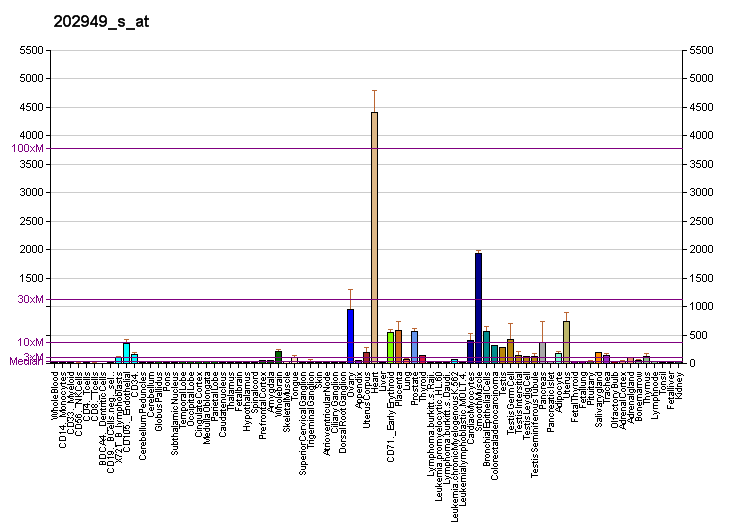
RNA expression pattern
| Bgee | Human / Mouse (ortholog); Top expressed in: myocardium of left ventricle; right ventricle; apex of heart; left ovary; right ovary; cardiac muscle tissue of right atrium; right auricle of heart; stromal cell of endometrium; urethra; saphenous vein / Top expressed in: right ventricle; cardiac muscles; myocardium of ventricle; cardiac muscle tissue of left ventricle; interventricular septum; atrioventricular valve; atrium; endocardial cushion; stroma of bone marrow; mucous cell of stomach; More reference expression data |
| BioGPS | More reference expression data |
Gene ontology
| Molecular function | transcription coactivator activity; transcription factor binding; metal ion binding; protein binding; androgen receptor binding; identical protein binding |
| Cellular component | cytoplasm; M band; focal adhesion; nucleoplasm; Z discdkac; nucleus |
| Biological process | androgen receptor signaling pathway; regulation of transcription, DNA-templated; heart trabecula formation; regulation of transcription by RNA polymerase II; negative regulation of apoptotic process; negative regulation of transcription by RNA polymerase II; transcription, DNA-templated; positive regulation of transcription, DNA-templated; osteoblast differentiation; response to hormone; atrial cardiac muscle cell development; negative regulation of transcription, DNA-templated; ventricular cardiac muscle cell development; regulation of lipid metabolic process; negative regulation of calcineurin-NFAT signaling cascade |
Sources:Amigo / QuickGO
Orthologs
| Databases | NCBI: entry; OMA: entry |
| Species | Human | Mouse |
| Entrez | 2274 | 14200 |
| Ensembl | ENSG00000115641 | ENSMUSG00000008136 |
| UniProt | Q14192 | O70433 |
| RefSeq (mRNA) | NM_001039492; NM_001450; NM_201555; NM_201556; NM_201557 NM_001318894; NM_001318895; NM_001318896; NM_001318897; NM_001318898; NM_001318899; NM_001374399 | NM_001289533; NM_010212 |
| RefSeq (protein) | NP_001034581; NP_001305823; NP_001305824; NP_001305825; NP_001305826 NP_001305827; NP_001305828; NP_001441; NP_963849; NP_963851; NP_001361328 | NP_001276462; NP_034342 |
| Location (UCSC) | Chr 2: 105.36 – 105.44 Mb | Chr 1: 43.16 – 43.24 Mb |
| PubMed search |
- Wikidata
| View/Edit Human | View/Edit Mouse |

Four and a half LIM domains protein 2 also known as FHL-2 is a protein that in humans is encoded by the FHL2 gene. LIM proteins contain a highly conserved double zinc finger motif called the LIM domain.

== Function ==
FHL-2 is thought to have a role in the assembly of extracellular membranes and may function as a link between presenilin-2 and an intracellular signaling pathway.

== Family ==
The Four-and-a-half LIM (FHL)-only protein subfamily is one of the members of the LIM-only protein family. Protein members within the group might be originated from a common ancestor and share a high degree of similarity in their amino acid sequence. These proteins are defined by the presence of the four and a half cysteine-rich LIM homeodomain with the half-domain always located in its N-terminus. The name LIM was derived from the first letter of the transcription factors LIN-11, ISL-1 and MEC-3, from which the domain was originally characterized. No direct interactions between LIM domain and DNA have been reported. Instead, extensive evidence points towards the functional role of FHL2 in supporting protein-protein interactions of LIM-containing proteins and its binding partners. Thus far, five members have been categorized into the FHL subfamily, which are FHL1, FHL2, FHL3, FHL4 and activator of CREM in testis (ACT) in human. FHL1, FHL2 and FHL3 are predominantly expressed in muscle, while FHL4 and FHL5 are expressed exclusively in testis.

== Gene ==
FHL2 is the best studied member within the subfamily. The protein is encoded by the fhl2 gene being mapped in the region of human chromosome 2q12-q14. Two alternative promoters, 1a and 1b, as well as 5 transcript variants of fhl2 have been reported.

== Tissue distribution ==
FHL2 exhibits diverse expression patterns in a cell/tissue-specific manner, which has been found in liver, kidney, lung, ovary, pancreas, prostate, stomach, colon, cortex, and in particular, the heart. However, its expression in some immune-related tissues like the spleen, thymus and blood leukocytes has not been documented. Intriguingly, the FHL2 expression and function varies significantly between different types of cancer. Such discrepancies are most likely due to the existence of the wide variety of transcription factors governing FHL2 expression.

== Regulation of expression ==
Different transcription factors that have been reported responsible for the regulation of fhl2 expression include the well-known tumor suppressor protein p53, serum response factor (SRF), specificity protein 1 (Sp1). the pleiotropic factor IL-1β, MEF-2, and activator protein-1 (AP-1). Apart from being regulated by different transcription factors, FHL2 is itself involved extensively in regulating the expression of other genes. FHL2 exerts its transcriptional regulatory effects by functioning as an adaptor protein interacting indirectly with the targeted genes. In fact, LIM domain is a platform for the formation of multimeric protein complexes. Therefore, FHL2 can contribute to human carcinogenesis by interacting with transcription factors of cancer-related genes and modulates the signaling pathways underlying the expression of these genes. Different types of cancer are associated with FHL2 which act either as the cancer suppressor or inducer, for example in breast cancer, gastrointestinal (GI) cancers, liver cancer and prostate cancer.

== Clinical significance ==
The expression and functions of FHL2 varies greatly depending on the cancer types. It appeared that phenomenon is highly related to the differential mechanistic transcriptional regulations of FHL2 in the various types of cancer. However, the participation of fhl2 mutations and the posttranslational modifications of fhl2 in carcinogenesis cannot be ignored. In fact, functional mutation of fhl2 has been identified in a patient with familial dilated cardiomyopathy (DCM) and is associated with its pathogenesis. This implied that fhl2 mutation may also profoundly affect the diverse cancer progressions. However, records describing the effects of fhl2 mutations on carcinogenesis are scarce.

Phosphorylation of FHL-2 protein has no significant effects on FHL2 functioning both in vitro and in vivo. Provided that the existence of posttranscriptional modifications on FHL2 other than phosphorylation is still unclear and FHL2 functions almost exclusively through protein-protein interactions, research works in this direction is still interested. In particular, the mechanisms underpinning the subcellular localization of FHL2 should be focused. FHL2 can traffic freely between nuclear and the different cellular compartments. It also interacts with other proteinaceous binding partners belonging to different functional classes including, but not limited to, transcription factors and signal transducers. Therefore, FHL2 translocation could be important in regulating the different molecular signaling pathways which modify carcinogenesis, for example, nuclear translocation of FHL2 is related to aggressiveness and recurrence of prostate cancer Similar evidence also has been identified in experiment using A7FIL+ cells and NIH 3T3 cell line as the disease model.

=== Breast cancer ===
The FHL2 protein interacts with the breast cancer type 1 susceptibility gene (BRCA1) which enhances the transactivation of BRCA1. In addition, intratumoral FHL2 level was one of the factors determining the worse survival of breast cancer patients

=== Gastrointestinal cancer ===
FHL2 is related to gastrointestinal cancers and in particular, colon cancer. Fhl2 demonstrates an oncogenic property in colon cancer which induces the differentiation of some in vitro colon cancer models. FHL2 is as well crucial to colon cancer cells invasion, migration and adhesion to extracellular matrix. The expression of FHL2 is positively regulated by transforming growth factor beta 1 (TGF-β1) stimulations which induces epithelial-mesenchymal transition (EMT) and endows cancer cells with metastatic properties. The TGF-β1-midiated alternation of FHL2 expression level might therefore trigger colon cell invasion. Besides, the subcellular localization of FHL2 can be modulated by TGF-β1 in sporadic colon cancer which resulted in the polymerization of alpha smooth muscle actin (α-SMA). This process induces the fibroblast to take up a myofibroblast phenotype and contributes to cancer invasion. FHL2 can also induce EMT and cancer cell migration by affecting the structural integrity of membrane-associated E-cadherin-β-catenin complex.

=== Liver cancer ===
In the most common form liver cancer, the hepatocellular carcinoma (HCC), FHL2 is always downregulated in the clinical samples. Therefore, fhl2 is exhibiting a tumor-suppressive effect on HCC. Similar to p53, overexpression of FHL2 inhibit the proliferative activity of the HCC Hep3B cell line by decreasing its cyclin D1 expression and increasing P21 and P27 expression supporting the time-dependent cellular repair process. Of note, a database of FHL2-regulated genes in murine liver has recently been established by using microarray and bioinformatics analysis, which provide useful information concerning most of the pathways and new genes related to FHL2.

=== Prostate cancer ===
The molecular communication between androgen receptor (AR) and FHL2 is linked to the disease development of prostate cancer such as aggressiveness and biochemical recurrence (i.e., rise in circulatory prostate-specific antigen (PSA) levels after surgical or radiography treatment) FHL2 expression is profoundly initiated by androgen through the mediation of serum response factor (SFR) and the RhoA / actin / megakaryocytic acute leukemia (MAL) signaling axis functioning upstream of SRF. On the other hand, FHL2 is the coactivator of AR and is able to modulate AR signaling by altering the effect of Aryl hydrocarbon receptor (AhR) imposing AR activity with as yet unknown mechanisms. Calpain cleavage of cytoskeletal protein filamin which is increased in prostate cancer could induce the nuclear translocation of FHL2, and this subsequently increase AR coactivation.

== Interactions ==
FHL2 has been shown to interact with:

- Androgen receptor,
- BRCA1,
- CTNNB1,
- CD18,
- CD29,
- CD49c,
- CREB1,
- EIF6,
- FHL3,
- IGFBP5,
- ITGA7,
- ITGB6,
- MAPK1,
- PSEN2,
- TRAF6,
- TTN,
- ZNF638, and
- ZBTB16.
