= CCDC78 =

Protein found in humans

Identifiers
- Aliases: CCDC78, C16orf25, CNM4, JFP10, hsCcdc78, coiled-coil domain containing 78
- External IDs: OMIM: 614666; MGI: 2685784; HomoloGene: 105408; GeneCards: CCDC78; OMA:CCDC78 - orthologs

Gene location (Human)
Chr.	Chromosome 16 (human)
Band	16p13.3	Start	722,582 bp
Band	16p13.3	End	726,954 bp

Gene location (Mouse)
Chr.	Chromosome 17 (mouse)
Band	17|17 A3.3	Start	26,005,554 bp
Band	17|17 A3.3	End	26,009,487 bp
RNA expression pattern
Bgee	Human / Mouse (ortholog); Top expressed in: right uterine tube; bronchial epithelial cell; olfactory zone of nasal mucosa; nasal epithelium; mucosa of paranasal sinus; right hemisphere of cerebellum; caudate nucleus; putamen; nucleus accumbens; pituitary gland / Top expressed in: ovary; Hypothalamus; lung; embryo; spermatocyte; morula; bone marrow; lens; Cerebellum; cerebellar cortex; More reference expression data
BioGPS	n/a
Orthologs
Species	Human	Mouse
Entrez	124093	381077
Ensembl	ENSG00000162004	ENSMUSG00000071202
UniProt	A2IDD5	D3Z5T1
RefSeq (mRNA)	NM_001031737; NM_173476; NM_001378030; NM_001378031; NM_001378033	NM_001165929
RefSeq (protein)	NP_001026907; NP_001364959; NP_001364960; NP_001364962	NP_001159401
Location (UCSC)	Chr 16: 0.72 – 0.73 Mb	Chr 17: 26.01 – 26.01 Mb
PubMed search
- Wikidata
View/Edit Human	View/Edit Mouse

Coiled-coil domain-containing 78 (CCDC78) is a protein in humans encoded by the CCDC78 gene. It has several aliases including C16orf25, FLJ34512, CNM4, and JFP10. It is located on the (-) strand on chromosome 16 (16p13.3). Its gene neighborhood includes NARFL (also on the minus strand), HAGHL, FAM173A, and METRN. The CCDC78 gene is 10,892 base pairs long, and the protein contains 438 amino acids. The protein weighs approximately 4.852 KDal. There are several isoforms, including one indicated with a unique congenital myopathy. Several expression profiles show it has ubiquitous expression at moderate levels. Although no paralogs exist several orthologs do.

== Function ==
The function of this gene is currently unknown. There is evidence that CCDC78 plays a role in skeletal muscle contraction. This is supported by structural similarities to other muscle proteins and by localization assays. CCDC78's predicted structure was similar to that of tropomyosin (see below). The gene product is found primarily in the perinuclear region, the sarcolemmal membrane, and in the reticular pattern of the sarcoplasm. However, localization assays predict it to also be found in the cytoplasm.

== mRNA ==

General Properties:

- Genomic DNA length: 10,892 bp
- Most common translated mRNA length: 1,317 bp
- 5' Untranslated region: 447 bp
- 3' Untranslated region: 2188 bp

Transcript Variants: There are 13 known alternative splicing patterns. These can be seen in the adjacent image. One of these is indicated in disease.

== Protein ==
General Properties:

- Contains two coiled-coil domains
- Molecular Weight: 4.852 KDal
- Isoelectric Point: 8.27

=== Expression ===
When looking at EST profiles in humans, CCDC78 seems to show ubiquitous expression at moderate levels.

Predicted post-translational modification: Phosphorylation of several serine residues has been predicted by using tools at ExPasy.

=== Predicted secondary structure ===
Secondary structure of CCDC78 was predicted using the protein secondary structure prediction tool PELE. As would be expected with a coiled-coil domain containing protein, there are several α-helices. The model was predicted to be 98% accurate to 65% of the protein. The predicted image can be seen below. This predicted model is closely related to tropomyosin - a contractile protein.

=== Protein-protein interactions ===
Only one protein has been found to interact with CCDC78. An analysis performed from IntAct showed an interaction between CCDC78 and dAK1_1 in Yersinia pestis.

== Homology ==
CCDC78 has no known paralogs in the human genome. However, it has several orthologs in other organisms. Orthologs can be found throughout the animal kingdom. CCDC78 is highly conserved in mammals. The coiled-coil domain is highly conserved throughout all orthologs, demonstrating the importance of these domains.

== Clinical relevance ==
A mutation in this gene has been shown to cause a unique congenital myopathy. This mutation is caused by alternative splicing - a 222 bp in-frame insertion. A group of researchers from the University of Michigan analyzed a family with a dominantly inherited congenital myopathy. After linkage analysis followed by whole-exome capture and next-generation sequencing, they found CCDC78 to be present in affected individuals and absent in >10,000 controls. They then successfully modeled this congenital myopathy in zebrafish. CCDC78 has also been associated with an immune response to Hepatitis B.
