= ZNF638 =

Protein-coding gene in the species Homo sapiens

Identifiers
- Aliases: ZNF638, NP220, ZFML, Zfp638, zinc finger protein 638
- External IDs: OMIM: 614349; MGI: 1203484; GeneCards: ZNF638

Gene location (Human)
Chr.	Chromosome 2 (human)
Band	2p13.2	Start	71,276,561 bp
Band	2p13.2	End	71,435,069 bp

Gene location (Mouse)
Chr.	Chromosome 6 (mouse)
Band	6|6 C3	Start	83,844,091 bp
Band	6|6 C3	End	83,966,532 bp
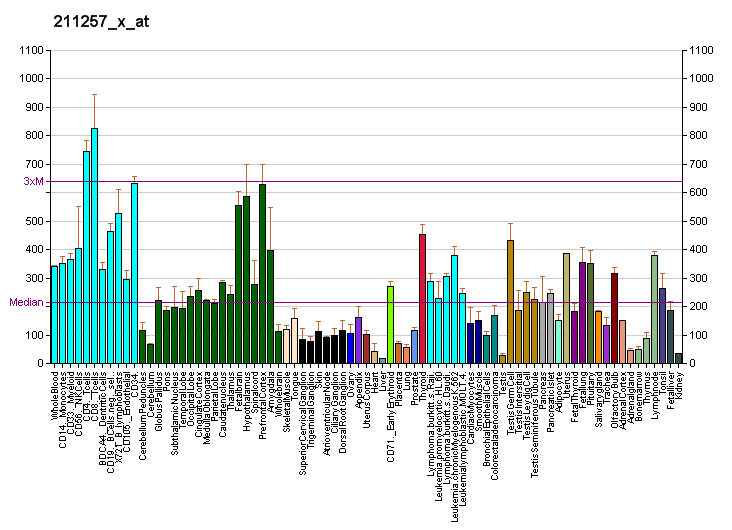

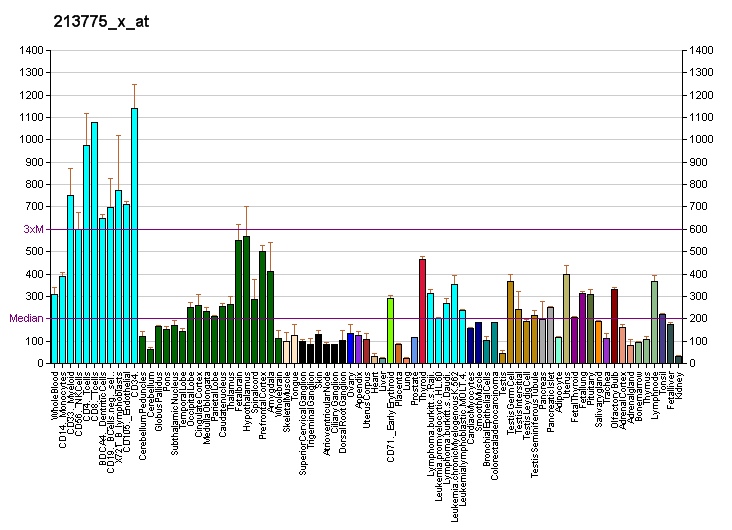
RNA expression pattern
Bgee	Human / Mouse (ortholog); Top expressed in: Achilles tendon; corpus callosum; cerebellar hemisphere; right hemisphere of cerebellum; anterior pituitary; ventricular zone; right uterine tube; tibial nerve; epithelium of colon; sural nerve / Top expressed in: genital tubercle; tail of embryo; ventricular zone; spermatocyte; ganglionic eminence; zygote; granulocyte; pineal gland; neural layer of retina; cerebellar cortex; More reference expression data
BioGPS	More reference expression data
Gene ontology
Molecular function	metal ion binding; DNA binding; zinc ion binding; double-stranded DNA binding; nucleic acid binding; RNA binding
Cellular component	cytoplasm; nuclear speck; intracellular membrane-bounded organelle; nucleus; nucleoplasm
Biological process	regulation of transcription, DNA-templated; transcription, DNA-templated; RNA splicing
Sources:Amigo / QuickGO
Orthologs
Databases	NCBI: entry; OMA: entry
Species	Human	Mouse
Entrez	27332	18139
Ensembl	ENSG00000075292	ENSMUSG00000030016
UniProt	Q14966	Q61464
RefSeq (mRNA)	NM_001014972; NM_001252612; NM_001252613; NM_014497	NM_001166371; NM_008717; NM_001355284; NM_001355285; NM_001355286
RefSeq (protein)	NP_001014972; NP_001239541; NP_001239542; NP_055312	NP_001159843; NP_032743; NP_001342213; NP_001342214; NP_001342215 NP_001393000; NP_001393001; NP_001393002; NP_001393003; NP_001393004; NP_001393005; NP_001393006; NP_001393007; NP_001393008; NP_001393009; NP_001393010; NP_001393011; NP_001393012; NP_001393013
Location (UCSC)	Chr 2: 71.28 – 71.44 Mb	Chr 6: 83.84 – 83.97 Mb
PubMed search
- Wikidata
View/Edit Human	View/Edit Mouse

Zinc finger protein 638 is a protein that in humans is encoded by the ZNF638 gene.

The protein encoded by this gene is a nucleoplasmic protein. It binds cytidine-rich sequences in double-stranded DNA. This protein has three types of domains: MH1, MH2 (repeated three times) and MH3. It is associated with packaging, transferring, or processing transcripts. Multiple alternatively spliced transcript variants have been found for this gene, but the biological validity of some variants has not been determined.

== Interactions ==
ZNF638 has been shown to interact with FHL2.
