= RPS6KA5 =

Enzyme

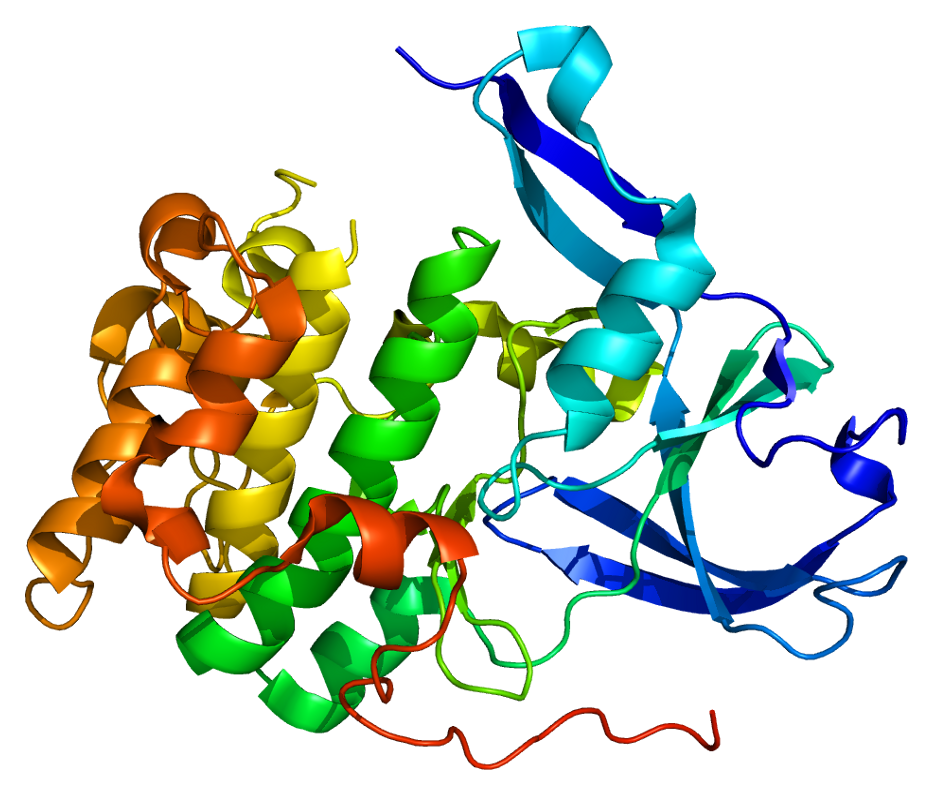

Identifiers
- Aliases: RPS6KA5, MSK1, MSPK1, RLPK, ribosomal protein S6 kinase A5
- External IDs: OMIM: 603607; MGI: 1920336; GeneCards: RPS6KA5
Available structures
PDB	Ortholog search: PDBe RCSB
PDB	List of PDB id codes 1VZO, 3KN5, 3KN6
Enzyme activity
EC #	BRENDA	ExPASy	KEGG	MetaCyc
2.7.11.1	↗	↗	↗	↗

Gene location (Human)
Chr.	Chromosome 14 (human)
Band	14q32.11	Start	90,847,861 bp
Band	14q32.11	End	91,060,641 bp

Gene location (Mouse)
Chr.	Chromosome 12 (mouse)
Band	12|12 E	Start	100,514,698 bp
Band	12|12 E	End	100,693,242 bp
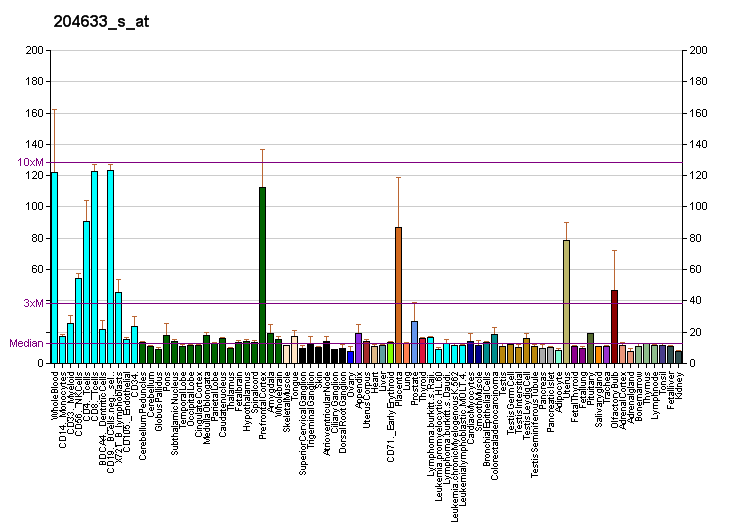

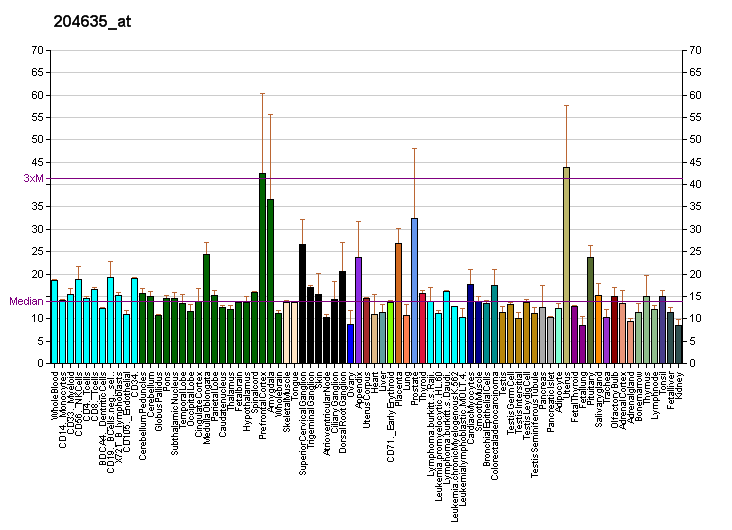
RNA expression pattern
Bgee	Human / Mouse (ortholog); Top expressed in: secondary oocyte; tail of epididymis; nipple; corpus callosum; inferior ganglion of vagus nerve; buccal mucosa cell; Brodmann area 23; pons; bronchial epithelial cell; Skeletal muscle tissue of biceps brachii / Top expressed in: dorsal striatum; zygote; olfactory tubercle; secondary oocyte; lobe of cerebellum; cerebellar vermis; nucleus accumbens; gastrula; subiculum; primary oocyte; More reference expression data
BioGPS	More reference expression data
Gene ontology
Molecular function	transferase activity; protein kinase activity; nucleotide binding; metal ion binding; kinase activity; protein binding; ATP binding; magnesium ion binding; protein serine/threonine kinase activity
Cellular component	cytoplasm; nucleoplasm; nucleus
Biological process	intracellular signal transduction; regulation of transcription, DNA-templated; epidermal growth factor receptor signaling pathway; phosphorylation; stimulatory C-type lectin receptor signaling pathway; axon guidance; positive regulation of histone acetylation; interleukin-1-mediated signaling pathway; protein phosphorylation; positive regulation of CREB transcription factor activity; positive regulation of NF-kappaB transcription factor activity; inflammatory response; negative regulation of transcription, DNA-templated; negative regulation of cytokine production; positive regulation of transcription by RNA polymerase II
Sources:Amigo / QuickGO
Orthologs
Databases	NCBI: entry; OMA: entry
Species	Human	Mouse
Entrez	9252	73086
Ensembl	ENSG00000100784	ENSMUSG00000021180
UniProt	O75582	Q8C050
RefSeq (mRNA)	NM_004755; NM_182398; NM_001322227; NM_001322228; NM_001322229 NM_001322230; NM_001322231; NM_001322232; NM_001322233; NM_001322234; NM_001322235; NM_001322236; NM_001322237; NM_001322238	NM_153587; NM_001330702
RefSeq (protein)	NP_001309156; NP_001309157; NP_001309158; NP_001309159; NP_001309160 NP_001309161; NP_001309162; NP_001309163; NP_001309164; NP_001309165; NP_001309166; NP_001309167; NP_004746; NP_872198	NP_001317631; NP_705815
Location (UCSC)	Chr 14: 90.85 – 91.06 Mb	Chr 12: 100.51 – 100.69 Mb
PubMed search
- Wikidata
View/Edit Human	View/Edit Mouse

Ribosomal protein S6 kinase alpha-5 is an enzyme that in humans is encoded by the RPS6KA5 gene. This kinase, together with RPS6KA4, are thought to mediate the phosphorylation of histone H3, linked to the expression of immediate early genes.

== Interactions ==
RPS6KA5 has been shown to interact with CREB1.
