= CREB1 =

Mammalian protein found in humans

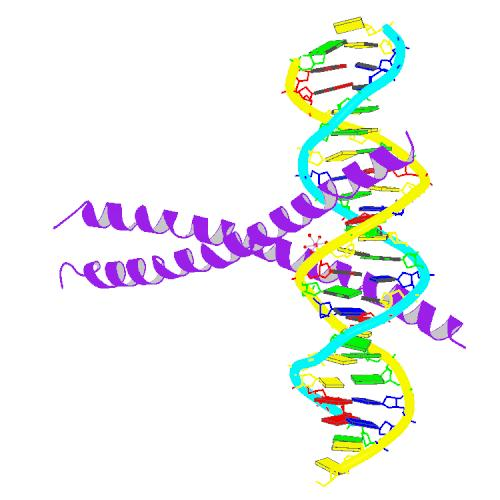

Identifiers
- Aliases: CREB1, CREB, CREB-1, cAMP responsive element binding protein 1
- External IDs: OMIM: 123810; MGI: 88494; GeneCards: CREB1
Available structures
PDB	Ortholog search: PDBe RCSB
PDB	List of PDB id codes 2LXT

Gene location (Human)
Chr.	Chromosome 2 (human)
Band	2q33.3	Start	207,529,737 bp
Band	2q33.3	End	207,605,988 bp

Gene location (Mouse)
Chr.	Chromosome 1 (mouse)
Band	1 C2|1 32.74 cM	Start	64,571,804 bp
Band	1 C2|1 32.74 cM	End	64,643,707 bp
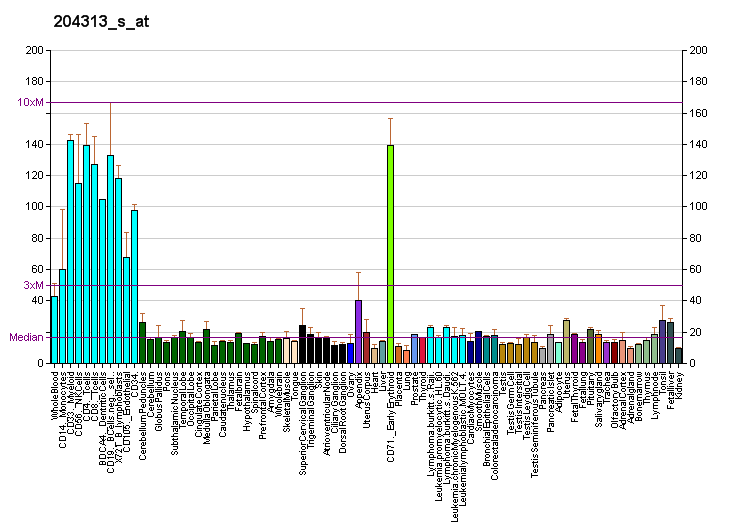

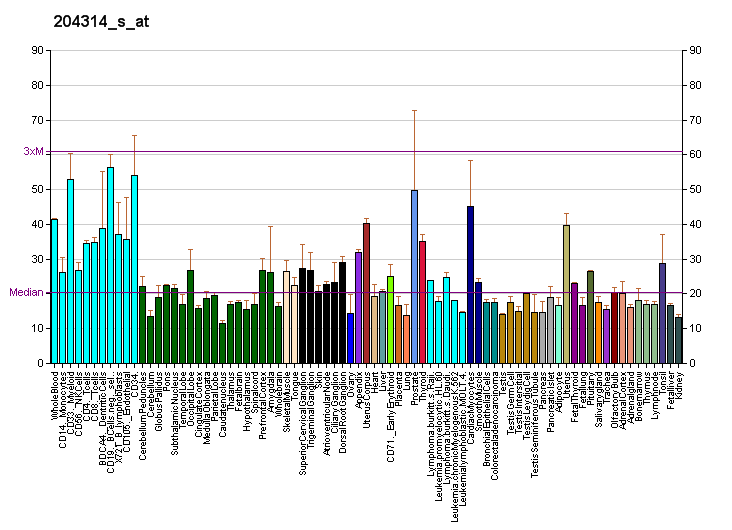

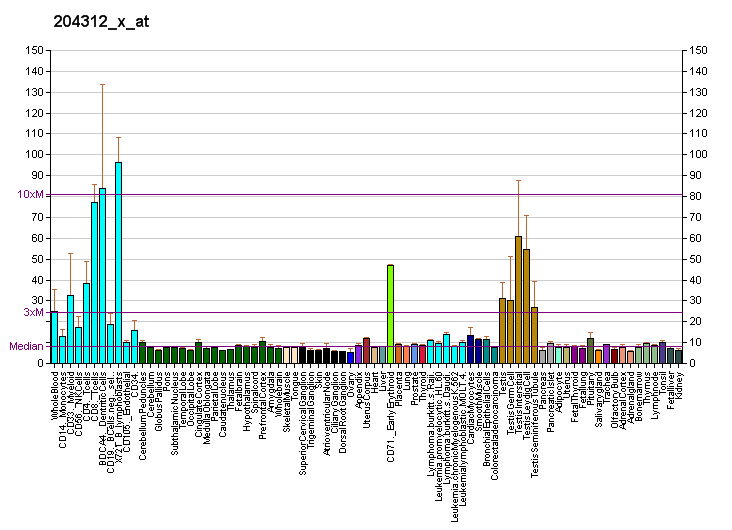
RNA expression pattern
Bgee	Human / Mouse (ortholog); Top expressed in: secondary oocyte; Achilles tendon; bone marrow cell; superficial temporal artery; trabecular bone; left testis; ganglionic eminence; skin of hip; right testis; epithelium of nasopharynx / Top expressed in: medial ganglionic eminence; Rostral migratory stream; ciliary body; genital tubercle; retinal pigment epithelium; pineal gland; human fetus; conjunctival fornix; maxillary prominence; tail of embryo; More reference expression data
BioGPS	More reference expression data
Gene ontology
Molecular function	DNA-binding transcription factor activity; DNA-binding transcription activator activity, RNA polymerase II-specific; cAMP response element binding; transcription coregulator activity; RNA polymerase II cis-regulatory region sequence-specific DNA binding; enzyme binding; protein binding; double-stranded DNA binding; DNA binding; sequence-specific DNA binding; identical protein binding; transcription factor activity, RNA polymerase II distal enhancer sequence-specific binding; DNA-binding transcription factor activity, RNA polymerase II-specific; transcription factor binding; Hsp70 protein binding; histone acetyltransferase binding; arrestin family protein binding
Cellular component	mitochondrion; nucleus; ATF4-CREB1 transcription factor complex; chromatin; transcription regulator complex; nucleoplasm; axon; mitochondrial matrix
Biological process	cellular response to nerve growth factor stimulus; positive regulation of lipid biosynthetic process; positive regulation of long-term synaptic potentiation; rhythmic process; cellular response to insulin-like growth factor stimulus; transcription by RNA polymerase II; response to organic substance; mammary gland development; protein phosphorylation; type I pneumocyte differentiation; circadian rhythm; positive regulation of multicellular organism growth; response to L-glutamate; lung saccule development; lung epithelium development; transforming growth factor beta receptor signaling pathway; regulation of apoptotic process; cellular response to transforming growth factor beta stimulus; response to glucagon; regulation of transcription, DNA-templated; negative regulation of transcription by competitive promoter binding; response to nicotine; positive regulation of osteoclast differentiation; memory; negative regulation of gene expression; transcription, DNA-templated; positive regulation of transcription, DNA-templated; lactation; positive regulation of transforming growth factor beta3 production; viral process; positive regulation of fat cell differentiation; negative regulation of neuron death; cell differentiation; cellular response to hepatocyte growth factor stimulus; protein stabilization; cellular response to platelet-derived growth factor stimulus; regulation of circadian rhythm; secretory granule organization; regulation of glial cell proliferation; visual learning; regulation of cell size; pituitary gland development; positive regulation of RNA polymerase II transcription preinitiation complex assembly; response to hypoxia; axonogenesis; regulation of fibroblast proliferation; cellular response to growth factor stimulus; ageing; chemotaxis to arachidonic acid; response to activity; cellular response to zinc ion; cellular response to fatty acid; positive regulation of apoptotic process; positive regulation of hormone secretion; signal transduction; positive regulation of transcription by RNA polymerase II; positive regulation of cardiac muscle tissue development; cellular response to leukemia inhibitory factor; cellular response to retinoic acid
Sources:Amigo / QuickGO
Orthologs
Databases	NCBI: entry; OMA: entry
Species	Human	Mouse
Entrez	1385	12912
Ensembl	ENSG00000118260	ENSMUSG00000025958
UniProt	P16220	Q01147
RefSeq (mRNA)	NM_004379; NM_134442; NM_001320793; NM_001371426; NM_001371427 NM_001371428	NM_001037726; NM_009952; NM_133828
RefSeq (protein)	NP_001307722; NP_004370; NP_604391; NP_001358355; NP_001358356 NP_001358357	NP_001032815; NP_034082; NP_598589
Location (UCSC)	Chr 2: 207.53 – 207.61 Mb	Chr 1: 64.57 – 64.64 Mb
PubMed search
- Wikidata
View/Edit Human	View/Edit Mouse

CAMP responsive element binding protein 1, also known as CREB-1, is a protein that in humans is encoded by the CREB1 gene. This protein binds the cAMP response element, a DNA nucleotide sequence present in many viral and cellular promoters. The binding of CREB1 stimulates transcription.

This protein is a CREB transcription factor that is a member of the leucine zipper family of DNA-binding proteins. This protein binds as a homodimer to the cAMP-responsive element, an octameric palindrome. The protein is phosphorylated by several protein kinases, and induces transcription of genes in response to hormonal stimulation of the cAMP pathway. Alternate splicing of this gene results in two transcript variants encoding different isoforms.

== See also ==
- CREB

== Interactions ==
CREB1 has been shown to interact with:

- CEBPB,
- CREB binding protein,
- FHL2,
- FHL3,
- FHL5.
- HTATIP,
- P53, and
- RPS6KA5.
