= FHL3 =

Protein-coding gene in humans

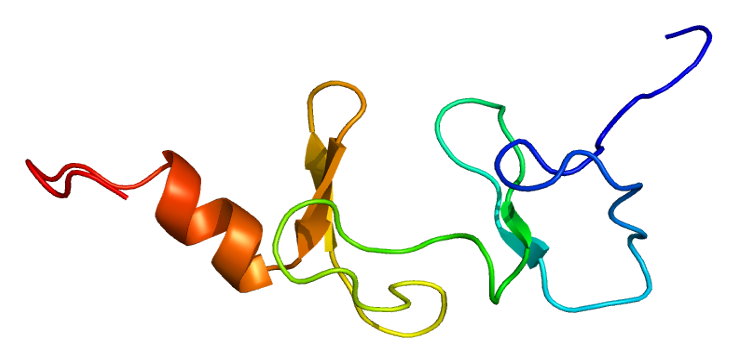

Identifiers
- Aliases: FHL3, SLIM2, four and a half LIM domains 3
- External IDs: OMIM: 602790; MGI: 1341092; GeneCards: FHL3
Available structures
PDB	Ortholog search: PDBe RCSB
PDB	List of PDB id codes 1WYH, 2CUQ, 2EHE

Gene location (Human)
Chr.	Chromosome 1 (human)
Band	1p34.3	Start	37,996,770 bp
Band	1p34.3	End	38,005,606 bp

Gene location (Mouse)
Chr.	Chromosome 4 (mouse)
Band	4|4 D2.2	Start	124,594,494 bp
Band	4|4 D2.2	End	124,602,404 bp
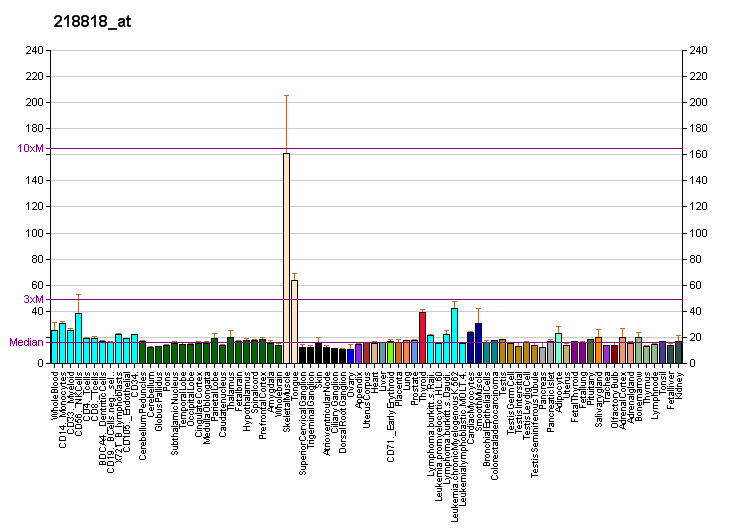
RNA expression pattern
Bgee	Human / Mouse (ortholog); Top expressed in: muscle of thigh; gastrocnemius muscle; Skeletal muscle tissue of rectus abdominis; vastus lateralis muscle; Skeletal muscle tissue of biceps brachii; thoracic diaphragm; triceps brachii muscle; deltoid muscle; tibialis anterior muscle; body of uterus / Top expressed in: muscle of thigh; lip; granulocyte; esophagus; genital tubercle; yolk sac; urethra; skeletal muscle tissue; embryo; male urethra; More reference expression data
BioGPS	More reference expression data
Gene ontology
Molecular function	actin binding; protein binding; metal ion binding
Cellular component	Z discdkac; nucleus; stress fiber; focal adhesion
Biological process	muscle organ development; actin cytoskeleton organization
Sources:Amigo / QuickGO
Orthologs
Databases	NCBI: entry; OMA: entry
Species	Human	Mouse
Entrez	2275	14201
Ensembl	ENSG00000183386	ENSMUSG00000032643
UniProt	Q13643; Q96C98	Q9R059
RefSeq (mRNA)	NM_004468; NM_001243878	NM_010213
RefSeq (protein)	NP_001230807; NP_004459; NP_001230807.1	NP_034343
Location (UCSC)	Chr 1: 38 – 38.01 Mb	Chr 4: 124.59 – 124.6 Mb
PubMed search
- Wikidata
View/Edit Human	View/Edit Mouse

Four and a half LIM domains protein 3 is a protein that in humans is encoded by the FHL3 gene.

LIM proteins are defined by the possession of a highly conserved double zinc finger motif called the LIM domain.

== Function ==
FHL3 plays a role in myogenesis, and also stimulates the development of neural crest by enhancing BMP signaling.

== Interactions ==
FHL3 has been shown to interact with:

- CREB1,
- CTBP2,
- FHL2,
- ITGA7 and
- KLF3.
