= Masticatory muscle myositis =

Inflammatory jaw muscle disease in dogs

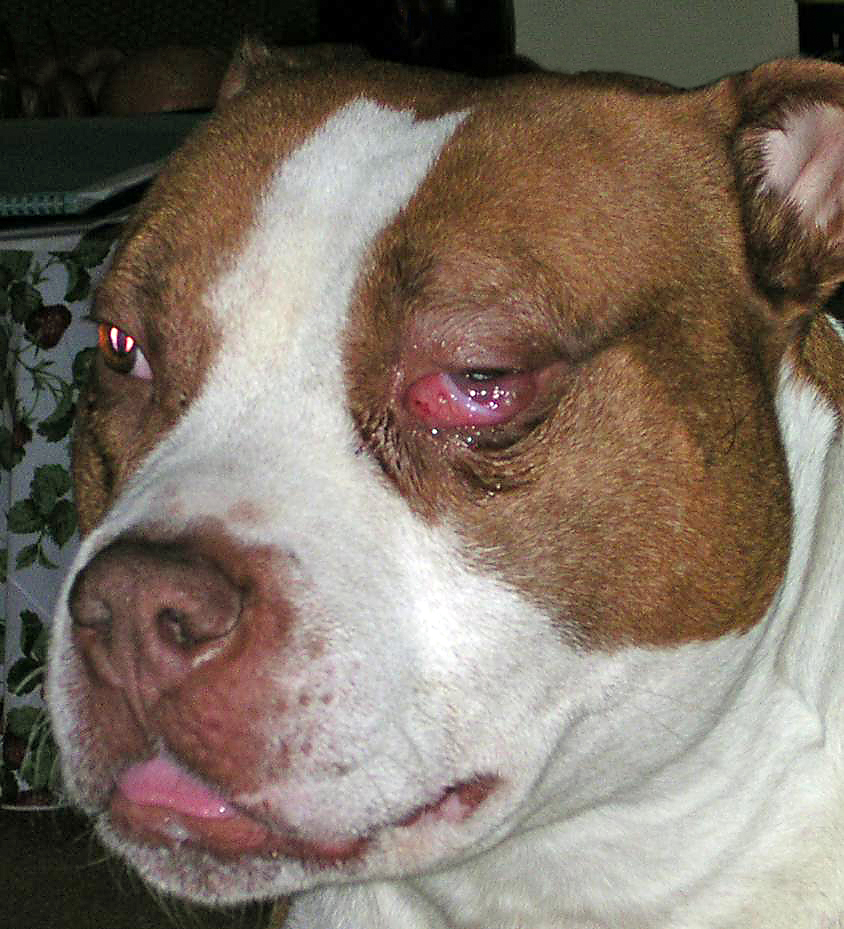
Acute MMM in an American Pit Bull Terrier

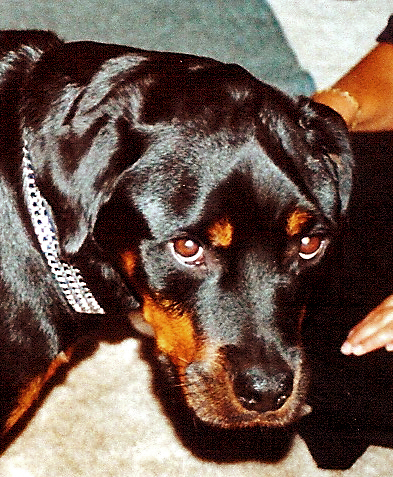
Chronic MMM in a Rottweiler

Masticatory muscle myositis (MMM) is an immune-mediated inflammatory disease in dogs affecting the muscles of mastication (chewing). It is also known as atrophic myositis or eosinophilic myositis. MMM is the most common inflammatory myopathy in dogs. The disease mainly affects large breed dogs. German Shepherd Dogs and Weimaraners are most commonly affected. Symptoms of acute MMM include swelling of the jaw muscles, drooling, and pain on opening the mouth. Ophthalmic signs may include third eyelid protrusion, red eyes, and exophthalmos (protruding eyeballs).

== Causes ==
MMM is caused by the presence of 2M fibers in the muscles of the jaw, 2M fibers are unique to the masticatory muscles and are made up of myosin. In affected animals, the immune system recognizes these proteins as foreign to the body and attacks them, resulting in inflammation.

== Symptoms ==
The inflammation from MMM typically results in anorexia, loss of body weight, pyrexia, and torpidity. Optic neuritis and blindness can occur in some cases. Acute cases last for one to three weeks without treatment. Chronic or repeat cases can result in fibrosis, atrophy, and enophthalmos. The fibrosis and atrophy can result in an inability to open the mouth in severe chronic cases.

== Diagnosis ==
Diagnostic results of acute myositis are eosinophilia, heightened serum levels of creatine phosphokinase, a positive 2M antibody test, and histopathology and biopsy of the temporalis or masseter muscles.

Biopsy reveals an orange colour to affected muscles and histopathology results are degeneration of the muscle fibre and neutrophil and eosinophil infiltration.

=== Differential diagnoses ===
- Abscess
- Orbital cellulitis
- Polymyositis
- Temporomandibular joint disease

== Treatment ==
Treatment is usually with corticosteroids such as prednisone, often with decreasing doses for up to 4–6 months, and in the case of trismus, manual opening of the mouth under anesthesia. Feeding very soft or liquid food during this time is usually necessary. The ultimate degree of recovery of jaw function and muscle mass will depend upon the extent of damage to the muscle tissue. Recurrence of MMM may occur.
