= Zaspopathy =

- Other names: Late-onset distal myopathy, Markesbery-Griggs type
- Zaspopathy has an autosomal dominant pattern of inheritance.

Zaspopathy, also called ZASP-related myofibril myopathy, is a novel autosomal dominant form of progressive muscular dystrophy, first described in 2005.

== Cause ==
The disease encompasses multiple forms of both distal and proximal myopathies, and is caused by mutations in the gene referred to as ZASP.

== Pathophysiology ==
The ZASP gene is located at chromosome 10, and encodes also-called Z-disk-associated protein. Mutations in this protein causes disintegration of the Z-disk of contractile elements (myofibrils) in muscle cells.

Mutations of several other Z-disk related proteins, such as desmin, alfa-B-crystallin and myotilin can cause disorders similar to zaspopathy.
