= Neuromuscular medicine =

Specialty of medicine that focuses on neuromuscular diseases

Neuromuscular medicine is a subspecialty of neurology and physiatry that focuses the diagnosis and management of neuromuscular diseases. The field encompasses issues related to both diagnosis and management of these conditions, including rehabilitation interventions to optimize the quality of life of individuals with these conditions. This field encompasses disorders that impact both adults and children and which can be inherited or acquired, typically from an autoimmune disease. A neurologist or physiatrist can diagnose these diseases through a clinical history, examination, and electromyography including nerve conduction studies. Many recent drug therapies have been developed to address the acquired neuromuscular diseases including but not limited to immune suppression and drugs that increase the neurotransmitters at the neuromuscular junction. Gene modifying therapies are also a recent treatment branch of neuromuscular medicine with advancements made in disorders such as spinal muscular atrophy and Duchenne muscular dystrophy.

== Research ==
The Muscular Dystrophy Association (MDA) engages in research, advocacy, and patient services addressing neuromuscular diseases. The organization supports initiatives aimed at understanding and treating these conditions.

== See also ==
- List of neuromuscular disorders
- Muscle
- Motor neuron diseases
