= FHL5 =

Protein-coding gene in the species Homo sapiens

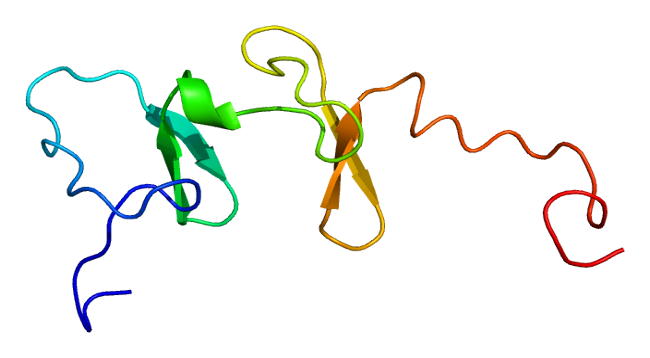

Identifiers
- Aliases: FHL5, ACT, dJ393D12.2, 1700027G07Rik, FHL-5, four and a half LIM domains 5
- External IDs: OMIM: 605126; MGI: 1913192; GeneCards: FHL5
Available structures
PDB	Ortholog search: PDBe RCSB
PDB	List of PDB id codes 1X68

Gene location (Human)
Chr.	Chromosome 6 (human)
Band	6q16.1	Start	96,562,548 bp
Band	6q16.1	End	96,618,626 bp

Gene location (Mouse)
Chr.	Chromosome 4 (mouse)
Band	4|4 A3	Start	25,199,908 bp
Band	4|4 A3	End	25,242,876 bp
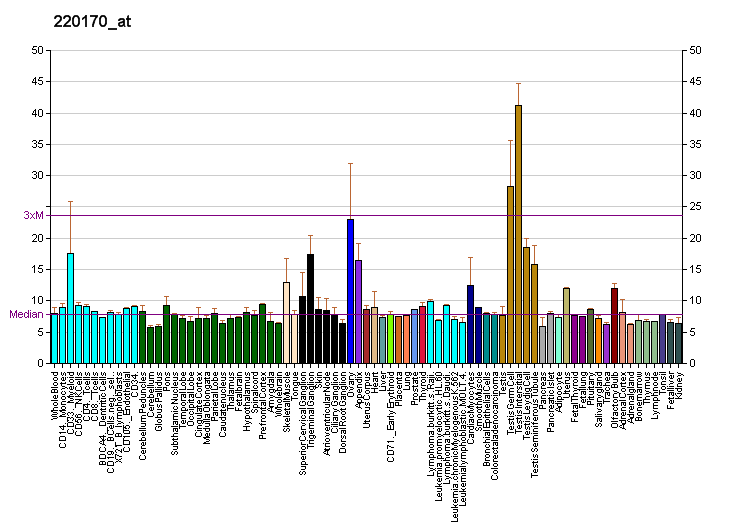
RNA expression pattern
Bgee	Human / Mouse (ortholog); Top expressed in: popliteal artery; tibial arteries; right coronary artery; sperm; left coronary artery; right testis; left testis; pericardium; Achilles tendon; Descending thoracic aorta / Top expressed in: seminiferous tubule; spermatid; spermatocyte; male urethra; muscle of thigh; secondary oocyte; esophagus; zygote; primary oocyte; skeletal muscle tissue; More reference expression data
BioGPS	More reference expression data
Gene ontology
Molecular function	transcription coactivator activity; protein binding; metal ion binding
Cellular component	nucleus; Z discdkac
Biological process	positive regulation of transcription by RNA polymerase II
Sources:Amigo / QuickGO
Orthologs
Databases	NCBI: entry; OMA: entry
Species	Human	Mouse
Entrez	9457	57756
Ensembl	ENSG00000112214	ENSMUSG00000028259
UniProt	Q5TD97	Q9WTX7
RefSeq (mRNA)	NM_001170807; NM_020482; NM_001322466; NM_001322467	NM_021318; NM_001355498; NM_001379528
RefSeq (protein)	NP_001164278; NP_001309395; NP_001309396; NP_065228	NP_067293; NP_001342427; NP_001366457
Location (UCSC)	Chr 6: 96.56 – 96.62 Mb	Chr 4: 25.2 – 25.24 Mb
PubMed search
- Wikidata
View/Edit Human	View/Edit Mouse

Four and a half LIM domains protein 5 is a protein that in humans is encoded by the FHL5 gene.

== Function ==
The protein encoded by this gene is coordinately expressed with activator of cAMP-responsive element modulator (CREM). It is associated with CREM and confers a powerful transcriptional activation function. CREM acts as a transcription factor essential for the differentiation of spermatids into mature spermatozoa. There are multiple polyadenylation sites found in this gene.

== Interactions ==
FHL5 has been shown to interact with CREB1 and CAMP responsive element modulator.
