= Tropomyosin 3 =

Protein found in humans

TPM3
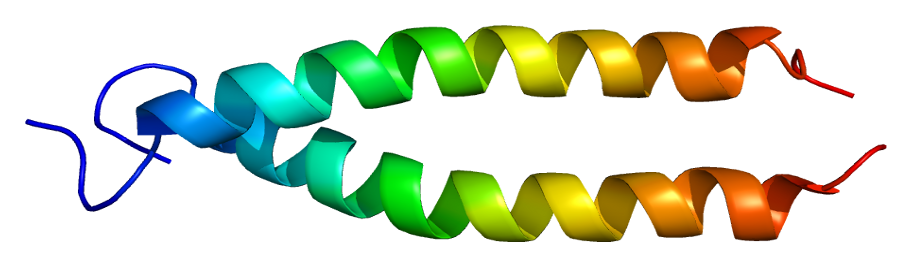

Identifiers
- Aliases: TPM3, CAPM1, CFTD, HEL-189, HEL-S-82p, NEM1, OK/SW-cl.5, TM-5, TM3, TM30, TM30nm, TM5, TPMsk3, TRK, hscp30, Tropomyosin 3, TPM3nu
- External IDs: OMIM: 191030; MGI: 1890149; GeneCards: TPM3

Gene location (Human)
Chr.	Chromosome 1 (human)
Band	1q21.3	Start	154,155,304 bp
Band	1q21.3	End	154,194,648 bp

Gene location (Mouse)
Chr.	Chromosome 3 (mouse)
Band	3|3 F1	Start	89,979,956 bp
Band	3|3 F1	End	90,008,209 bp
RNA expression pattern
Bgee	Human / Mouse (ortholog); Top expressed in: muscle of thigh; Skeletal muscle tissue of rectus abdominis; thoracic diaphragm; biceps brachii; gastrocnemius muscle; Skeletal muscle tissue of biceps brachii; glutes; vastus lateralis muscle; triceps brachii muscle; monocyte / Top expressed in: soleus muscle; tail of embryo; genital tubercle; granulocyte; ankle; plantaris muscle; intercostal muscle; yolk sac; extraocular muscle; thoracic diaphragm; More reference expression data
BioGPS	n/a
Gene ontology
Molecular function	actin binding; protein binding; structural constituent of muscle; actin filament binding; molecular function
Cellular component	cytoplasm; muscle thin filament tropomyosin; extracellular exosome; cytoskeleton; stress fiber; cytosol; actin filament; actin cytoskeleton
Biological process	muscle filament sliding; muscle contraction; actin filament organization
Sources:Amigo / QuickGO
Orthologs
Databases	NCBI: entry; OMA: entry
Species	Human	Mouse
Entrez	7170	59069
Ensembl	ENSG00000143549	ENSMUSG00000027940
UniProt	P06753	P21107
RefSeq (mRNA)	NM_001043351; NM_001043352; NM_001043353; NM_001278188; NM_001278189 NM_001278190; NM_001278191; NM_152263; NM_153649; NM_001349679; NM_001364679; NM_001364680; NM_001364681; NM_001364682; NM_001364683	NM_001253738; NM_001253740; NM_001271764; NM_001293748; NM_001293749 NM_022314; NM_001357581
RefSeq (protein)	NP_001036816; NP_001036817; NP_001036818; NP_001265117; NP_001265118 NP_001265119; NP_001265120; NP_689476; NP_705935; NP_001336608; NP_001351608; NP_001351609; NP_001351610; NP_001351611; NP_001351612	NP_001240667; NP_001240669; NP_001258693; NP_001280677; NP_001280678 NP_071709; NP_001344510
Location (UCSC)	Chr 1: 154.16 – 154.19 Mb	Chr 3: 89.98 – 90.01 Mb
PubMed search
- Wikidata
View/Edit Human	View/Edit Mouse

Tropomyosin alpha-3 chain is a protein that in humans is encoded by the TPM3 gene.

This gene encodes a member of the tropomyosin family of actin-binding proteins involved in the contractile system of striated and smooth muscles and the cytoskeleton of non-muscle cells. Tropomyosins are dimers of coiled-coil proteins that polymerize end-to-end along the major groove in most actin filaments. They provide stability to the filaments and regulate access of other actin-binding proteins. In muscle cells, they regulate muscle contraction by controlling the binding of myosin heads to the actin filament. Mutations in this gene result in autosomal dominant nemaline myopathy, and oncogenes formed by chromosomal translocations involving this locus are associated with cancer. Multiple transcript variants encoding different isoforms have been found for this gene.
