= Multi/minicore myopathy =

- Specialty: Cardiology

Multi/minicore myopathy is a congenital myopathy usually caused by mutations in either the SELENON and RYR1 genes. It is characterised the presence of multifocal, well-circumscribed areas with reduction of oxidative staining and low myofibrillar ATPase on muscle biopsy. It is also known as Minicore myopathy, Multicore myopathy, Multiminicore myopathy, Minicore myopathy with external ophthalmoplegia, Multicore myopathy with external ophthalmoplegia and Multiminicore disease with external ophthalmoplegia.

== Presentation ==
There are four types of minicore myopathy

Classical type (75% cases)

The usual presentation is in infancy or childhood with hypotonia or proximal weakness. This weakness tends to affect the shoulder girdle and the inner thigh.

The other main features are

- Failure to thrive due to feeding difficulties
- Axial muscle weakness, particularly affecting neck and trunk flexors
- High pitched voice
- Myopathic facial features

A high arched or cleft palate may be present.

Later developing features include a progressive scoliosis and respiratory impairment.

Ophthalmoplegic form (5–10% cases)

This typically presents with weakness of abduction and upward gaze. Ptosis may occur. There is also weakness of the proximal limb muscles.

Progressive form with hand involvement (10% cases)

The type presents with progressive hand weakness and hypermobility. Hip girdle weakness may be present and exercise induced myalgia is common.

Scoliosis and respiratory problems are mild or absent.

Antenatal form with arthrogryposis multiplex congenita (10% cases)

This diagnosis may be suspected prenatally with reduced fetal movements and polyhydramnios. This typically presents with contractures at birth due to poor foetal movement.

Other features include a long head, low set ears and a short neck.

The respiratory muscles can be moderately to severely affected and problems with breathing are common.

== Genetics ==
The most common causes are mutations in the RYR1 and SELENON genes. In these cases the inheritance is autosomal recessive. Less common recessive mutations causing this condition include those in the TTN, MEGF10 and CACNA1S genes. Automsomal dominant mutations associated with this disease include those in MYH7 and CACNA1S.

The pathogenesis is not well understood at present.

== Diagnosis ==
The diagnosis may be suspected on clinical grounds.

On blood testing the creatine kinase may be raised.

Imaging with ultrasound or MRI will show abnormalities in the affected muscles but these changes are not diagnostic.

The diagnostic test is a muscle biopsy.

On biopsy type 1 fibres predominate. The sarcomeres are disorganised and the mitochondria depleted. Necrosis and fibrosis are absent. Within the fibres multiple cores are visible.

=== Differential diagnosis ===
- Central core disease
- Centronuclear myopathy
- Congenital muscular dystrophy with rigidity of the spine

== Management ==
There is presently no curative treatment. Management is supportive.

There is an association with malignant hyperthermia and this should be borne in mind if anesthesia is required.

== Epidemiology ==
The epidemiology of this condition is not known. Studies have suggested that the prevalence of all congenital myopathies lies between 35 and 50 per million children.

== History ==
This condition was first described in 1971.
