= Central core disease =

Autosomal dominant genetic disorder

Central Core Disease
- Other names: Central core myopathy
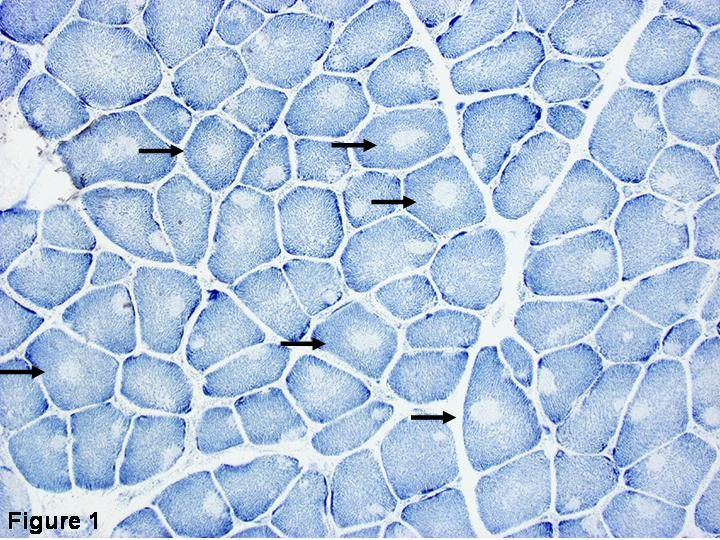
- Histopathologic appearance of typical central core disease: NADH-TR, transverse section from the rectus femoris. Marked predominance of dark staining, high oxidative type 1 fibres with cores affecting the majority of fibres. Cores are typically well demarcated and centrally located (→), but may occasionally be multiple and of eccentric location.
- Specialty: Neurology

Central core disease (CCD), also known as central core myopathy, is an autosomal dominant inherited muscle disorder present from birth that negatively affects the skeletal muscles. It was first described by Shy and Magee in 1956. It is characterized by the appearance of the myofibril under the microscope.

== Signs and symptoms ==
The symptoms of CCD are variable, but usually involve hypotonia (decreased muscle tone) at birth, mild delay in child development (highly variable between cases), weakness of the facial muscles, and skeletal malformations such as scoliosis and hip dislocation.

CCD is usually diagnosed in infancy or childhood, but some patients remain asymptomatic until adulthood to middle age.

== Pathophysiology ==
Central core disease has an autosomal dominant pattern of inheritance.

Central core disease is inherited in an autosomal dominant fashion. Most cases have demonstrable mutations in the ryanodine receptor type 1 (RYR1) gene, which are often de novo (newly developed). People with CCD are at increased risk for developing malignant hyperthermia (MH) when receiving general anesthesia.

== Diagnosis ==
The diagnosis is made based on the combination of typical symptoms and the appearance on biopsy (tissue sample) from muscle. The name derives from the typical appearance of the biopsy on light microscopy, where the muscle cells have cores that are devoid of mitochondria and specific enzymes.

Respiratory insufficiency develops in a small proportion of cases. Creatine kinase tend to be normal and electromyography (EMG) shows short duration, short amplitude motor unit action potentials.

== Treatment ==
There is no specific treatment for central core disease. Certain triggering anesthetics must be avoided, and relatives should be screened for RYR1 mutations that cause malignant hyperthermia.

Research has shown that some patients may benefit from treatment with oral salbutamol.
