= Neuromuscular disease =

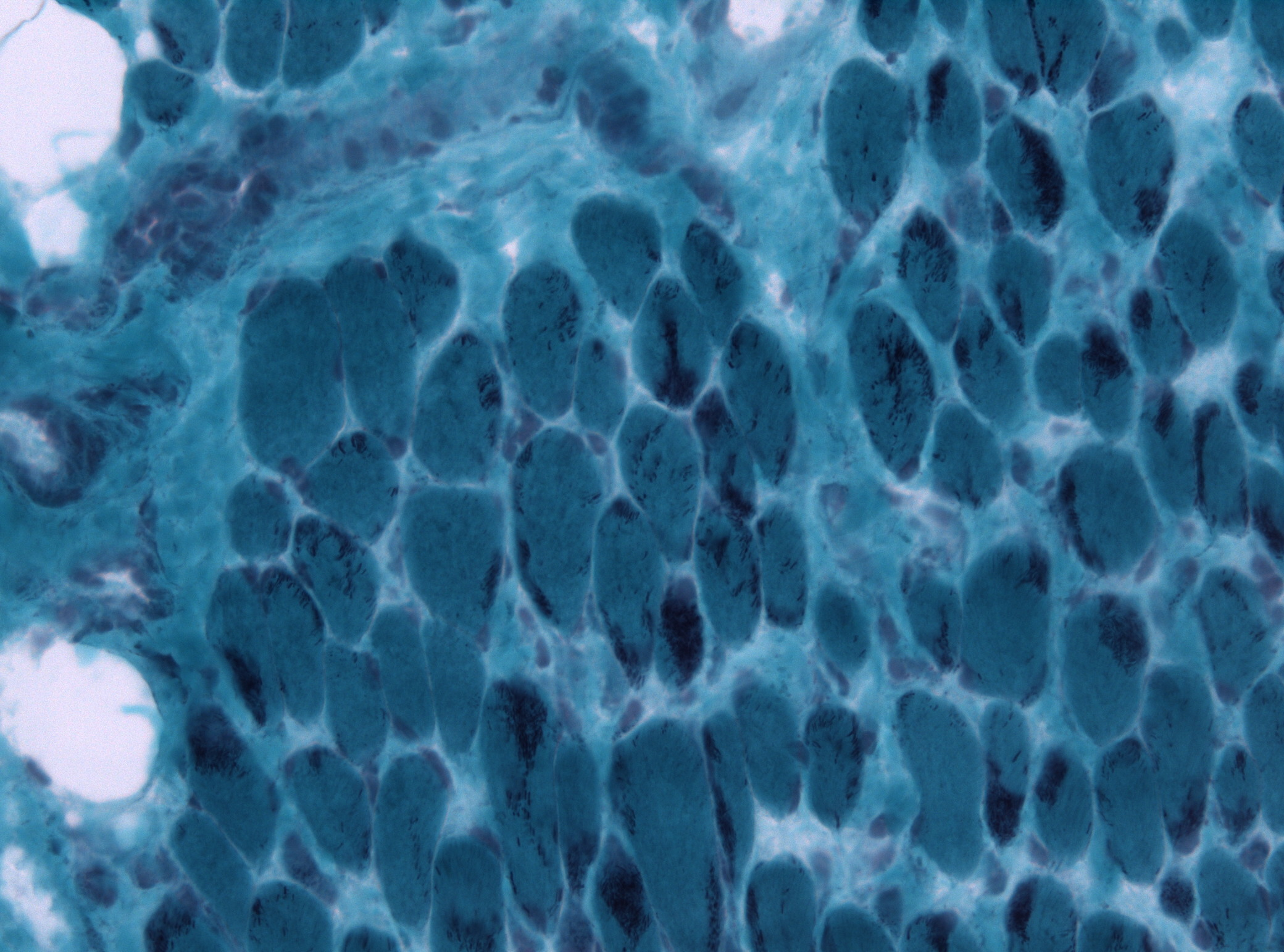
- Congenital nemaline myopathy (neuromuscular disorder)
- Specialty: Neurology, neuromuscular medicine, physical medicine and rehabilitation
- Causes: Autoimmune disorders, genetic disorders, environmental factors
- Diagnostic method: Muscle electrophysiology tests, genetic testing
- Treatment: Depends on the disorder; many currently have no cure

A neuromuscular disease is any disease affecting the peripheral nervous system (PNS), (Note: Lower motor neurons originate in the anterior horn of the spinal cord, a part of the central nervous system. However, the anterior horn is also part of the motor unit. Diseases that affect the anterior horn are classified as neuromuscular.) the neuromuscular junctions, or skeletal muscles, all of which are components of the motor unit. Damage to any of these structures can cause muscle atrophy and weakness. Issues with sensation can also occur.

Neuromuscular diseases can be acquired or genetic. Mutations of more than 650 genes have shown to be causes of neuromuscular diseases. Other causes include nerve or muscle degeneration, autoimmunity, toxins, medications, malnutrition, metabolic derangements, hormone imbalances, infection, nerve compression/entrapment, comprised blood supply, and trauma.

== Signs and symptoms ==

Symptoms of neuromuscular disease may include numbness, paresthesia, muscle atrophy, a pseudoathletic appearance, exercise intolerance, myalgia (muscle pain), fasciculations (muscle twitches), myotonia (delayed muscle relaxation), hypotonia (lack of resistance to passive movement), fixed muscle weakness (a static symptom), or premature muscle fatigue (a dynamic symptom).

== Causes ==
Neuromuscular disease can be caused by autoimmune disorders, genetic/hereditary disorders and some forms of the collagen disorder Ehlers–Danlos syndrome, exposure to environmental chemicals and poisoning which includes heavy metal poisoning. The failure of the electrical insulation surrounding nerves, the myelin, is seen in certain deficiency diseases, such as the failure of the body's system for absorbing vitamin B-12.

Diseases of the motor end plate include myasthenia gravis, a form of muscle weakness due to antibodies against acetylcholine receptor, and its related condition Lambert–Eaton myasthenic syndrome (LEMS). Tetanus and botulism are bacterial infections in which bacterial toxins cause increased or decreased muscle tone, respectively. Muscular dystrophies, including Duchenne's and Becker's, are a large group of diseases, many of them hereditary or resulting from genetic mutations, where the muscle integrity is disrupted, they lead to progressive loss of strength and decreased life span.

Further causes of neuromuscular diseases are:

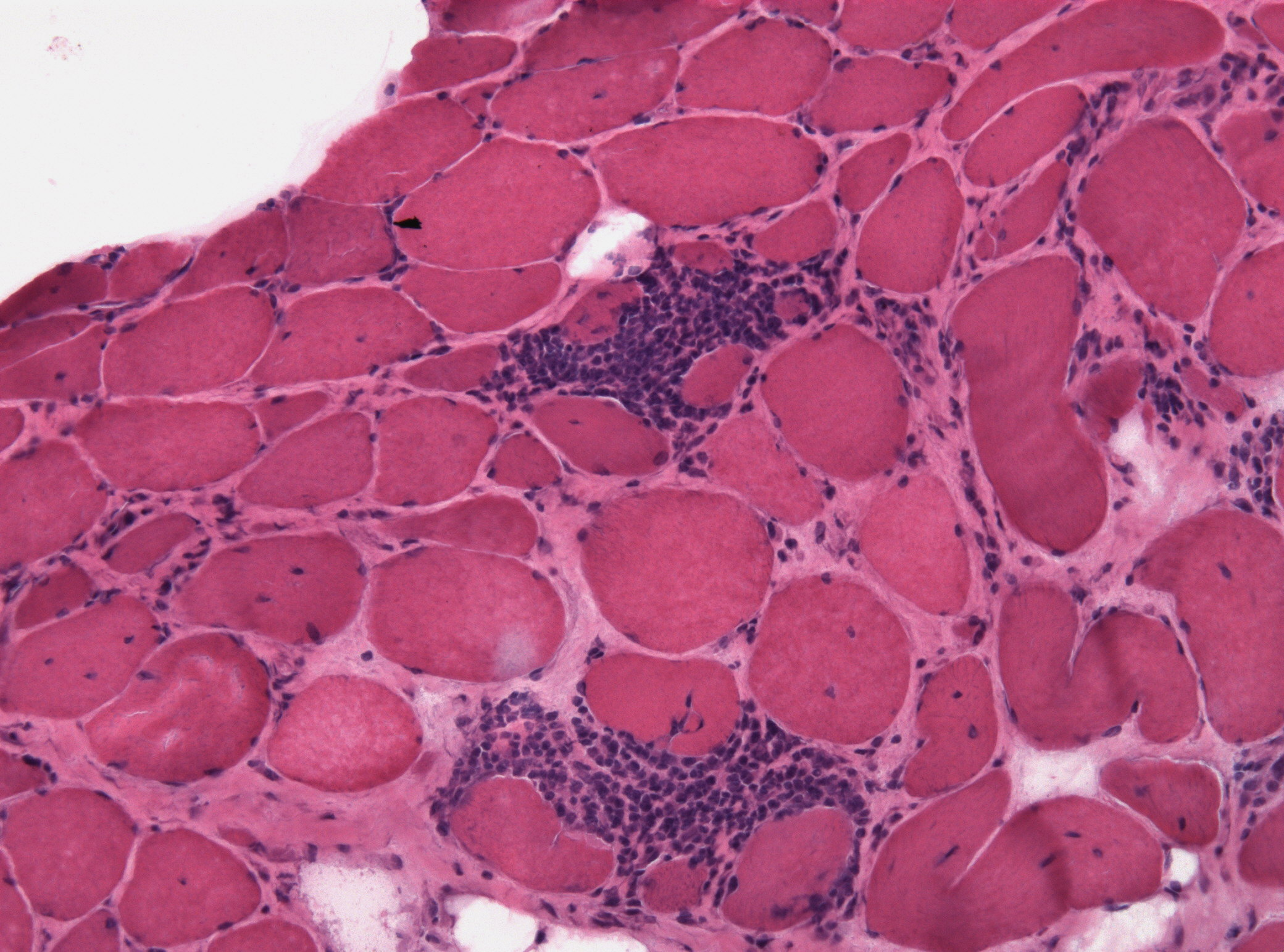
Polymyositis

Inflammatory muscle disorders

- Polymyalgia rheumatica (or "muscle rheumatism") is an inflammatory condition that mainly occurs in the elderly; it is associated with giant-cell arteritis (It often responds to prednisolone).
- Polymyositis is an autoimmune condition in which the muscle is affected.
- Rhabdomyolysis is the breakdown of muscular tissue due to any cause.

Tumors

- Smooth muscle: leiomyoma (benign)
- Striated muscle: rhabdomyoma (benign)

== Diagnosis ==
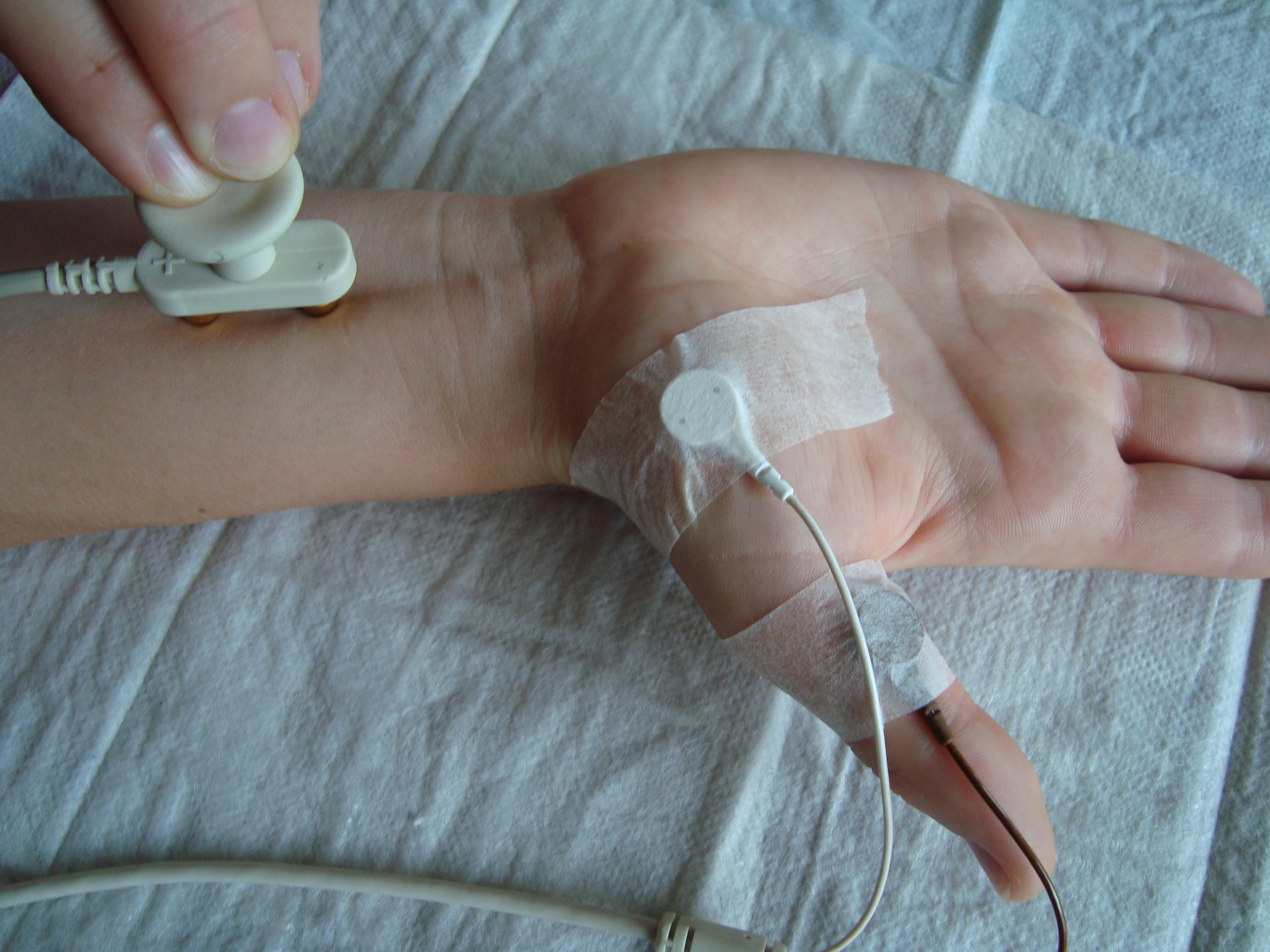
Nerve conduction velocity (study)

Diagnostic procedures that may reveal muscular disorders include direct clinical observations. This usually starts with the observation of bulk, possible atrophy or loss of muscle tone. Neuromuscular disease can also be diagnosed by various blood tests and using electrodiagnostic medicine tests including electromyography (measuring electrical activity in muscles) and nerve conduction studies. Genetic testing is an important part of diagnosing inherited neuromuscular conditions.

== Prognosis ==
Prognosis and management vary by disease.

== See also ==
- List of neuromuscular disorders
- Motor neuron diseases
- Neuromuscular medicine
