= Benign acute childhood myositis =

Syndrome of muscle weakness in children

Benign acute childhood myositis (BACM) is a syndrome characterized by muscle weakness and pain in the lower limbs that develop in children after a recent viral illness. It is transient with a spontaneous clinical resolution within 1 week.

== Symptoms ==
Prodromal symptoms are typically fever, cough, and rhinorrhea. BACM symptoms that follow are most frequently calf pain, gait complaints, and inability to walk. The condition is self-limited and full restitution can be expected. In very rare cases, however, rhabdomyolysis may develop.

Affected are preschool and school-age children with a male predominance. In one study, the median age was 6 years (range 2–13.2 years). It has been estimated that BACM has an incidence of 2.69 cases per 100,000 children (<18 years) during epidemic seasons and 0.23 cases during non-epidemic seasons.

== Diagnosis ==
The history of a preceding influenza-like infection followed by the typical symptoms of acute onset of symmetrical calf pain and gait problems together with an isolated finding of a high level of creatine kinase suggests the diagnosis of BACM. Myoglobinuria is rare and points to the possibility of the development of rhabdomyolysis and kidney failure.

Guillain-Barré syndrome (GBS) is the main consideration in the differential diagnosis. It needs to be quickly excluded as early intervention in GBS is indicated. Other conditions under possible consideration are dermatomyositis, muscular dystrophy, juvenile idiopathic arthritis, transient synovitis of the hip, osteomyelitis, and myalgia.

Few muscle biopsies have been conducted. Results may show normal findings or features of inflammation and necrosis.

== Preceding viral infections ==
A number of different preceding viral infections have been reported, most commonly influenza A and B. The condition appears to be more prevalent during late fall, winter, and spring. Other virus infections that have been linked to BACM are those caused by Parainfluenza, Coxsackievirus, Adenovirus, Echovirus, and Mycoplasma pneumonia. Viral myositis after viral infections may also occur in adults, and viruses, such as COVID-19, have been reported as a rare cause of myositis.

== Management ==
BACM may be alarming to parents and lead to unnecessary extensive tests. Treatment consists of oral analgesics, rest, and adequate hydration. Hospitalization is usually not necessary. Full recovery can be expected within a week, however, recurrences can occur.

== History ==
in 1957 Lundberg reported on a group of patients with a condition he named myalgia cruris epidemica, seemingly the first description of BACM. Other terms later used include influenza-associated myositis, viral myositis, acute myositis Middleton and colleagues reported on BACM as severe myositis after influenza in 1970. Viral myositis may occur also in later years.
