= Congenital myopathy =

Congenital Myopathy
- Specialty: Neurology

Congenital myopathy is a very broad term for any muscle disorder present at birth. This defect primarily affects skeletal muscle fibres and causes muscular weakness and/or hypotonia. Congenital myopathies account for one of the top neuromuscular disorders in the world today, comprising approximately 6 in 100,000 live births every year. As a whole, congenital myopathies can be broadly classified as follows:

- A distinctive abnormality in skeletal muscle fibres on the cellular level; observable via light microscope
- Symptoms of muscle weakness and hypotonia
- Is a congenital disorder, meaning it occurs during development and symptoms present themselves at birth or in early life.
- Is a genetic disorder.

== Classification ==
=== Myopathies with inclusion bodies and abnormal protein accumulation ===
Congenital myopathies with inclusion bodies and protein accumulation is a broad category, and some congenital myopathies that fall within this group are well understood, such as nemaline myopathy (see below). Typically, the development error in this category occurs when muscle proteins aggregate and build up in the sarcoplasm, which leads to muscle dysfunction.

=== Myopathies with cores ===
'Core myopathies' such as multicore myopathy and central core disease are characterized by sharply-demarcated areas devoid of oxidative enzymes NADH, SDH, and COX, in muscle fibres.

=== Myopathies with central nuclei ===
Myopathies with central nuclei, such as myotubular myopathy, involves an error in the gene involved in vesicle movement throughout the cell. This creates problems in vesicles reaching the plasma membrane with the cellular components necessary to fuse myoblast, a major step in the formation of the skeletal muscle. This creates structural problems throughout the skeletal muscle and in the Z line of the sarcomere, creating the weakness in the muscle.

=== Myopathies with fiber size variation ===
Myopathies with varying fiber size, such as congenital fiber type disproportion, occurs when type 1 fibers, the slow twitch fibers involved in sustaining activity, are smaller than type 2 fibers, the fast twitch fibers involved in quick activity. Since smaller type 1 fibers is not associated with nemaline myopathy, the most common type of congenital myopathy, it has not been studied in as great detail as many of the others. However, the smaller type 1 fibers explains why patients typically can participate in activities for shorter periods of time, but struggle with extended activity.

== Diagnosis ==
There are rarely any specific tests for the congenital myopathies except for muscle biopsy. Tests can be run to check creatine kinase in the blood, which is often normal or mildly elevated in congenital myopathies. Electromyography can be run to check the electrical activity of the muscle. Diagnosis heavily relies on muscle pathology, where a muscle biopsy is visualised on the cellular level. Diagnosis usually relies on this method, as creatine kinase levels and electromyography can be unreliable and non-specific. Since congenital myopathies are genetic, there have been advancements in prenatal screenings.

=== Types ===
The conditions included under the term "congenital myopathy" can vary. One source includes nemaline myopathy, myotubular myopathy, central core myopathy, congenital fiber type disproportion, and multicore myopathy. The term can also be used more broadly, to describe conditions present from birth.

==== Nemaline myopathy ====
Nemaline myopathy was first described in 1963 and is the most common congenital myopathy. It is characterized by generalized muscle weakness and low muscle tone. In its severest form, affected babies often die from respiratory failure. To date, 9 gene mutations have been found to cause nemaline myopathy. 6 of the identified genes are associated with the actin filament, which is the basis for muscle contraction. Histologically, nemaline rods stain red with Gomori's trichrome and are mostly seen in the subsarcolemmal region of muscle fibres. Nemaline rods have also been observed in the intermyofibrillar region of muscle fibres and within the nucleus. Nemaline myopathy is an autosomal dominant and sometimes an autosomal recessive genetic disorder. Sporadic cases have also been described.

==== Myotubular myopathy ====
Myotubular myopathy, also known as centronuclear myopathy, is recognized by pain during exercise and difficulty walking. People affected by this disease typically are wheelchair-reliant by middle adulthood, have weakness in the muscles involved in eye movement, nerve function disorders, and some form of intellectual disability. Myotubular myopathy is very rare, with less than 50 families currently affected. Genetically, myotubular myopathy can have two causes: autosomal dominant and autosomal recessive. When caused by a mutation in the DNM2 gene, the disorder is autosomal dominant, meaning it can be passed on by one mutated gene. When the mutation takes place in the BIN1 gene, the disease is instead autosomal recessive, and both genes must be mutated for the disease to be inherited. Autosomal recessive onset is most common.

==== Central core disease ====
Central core disease or central core myopathy was first described in 1956 and usually presents in infancy or early childhood as non-progressive mild proximal weakness that persists throughout life. Central core disease is believed to be more prevalent than currently reported, as it is hard to recognize and often misdiagnosed in early childhood. Central core disease has been found to be allelic with malignant hyperthermia, which is a life-threatening anesthetic reaction that causes a rise in body temperature, muscular rigidity and muscular breakdown, grossly elevated creatine kinase, and acidosis. Central core disease is caused by a mutation in the RYR1 gene.

==== Congenital fiber type disproportion ====
Congenital fiber type disproportion affects skeletal muscle, typically causing weakness in the shoulders, upper arms, thighs, and hips. Skeletal muscle is made up of two kinds of fiber, type 1 and type 2. In congenital fiber type disproportion, type 1 fibers are not only smaller but often more abundant than type 2 fibers. This leads to affected individuals being able to maintain an active lifestyle, though they usually have lower levels of stamina. Severity with this disease varies greatly, but people typically present symptoms by the age of one. Individuals do not usually worsen with time, and cases have even been reported of improvements.

==== Multicore myopathy ====
Multicore myopathy also referred to as minicore myopathy, is associated with small areas of decreased oxidative activities, resulting in areas that appear in this histology as "cores". These appear through microscopy very similar to central core, however the cores are typically smaller in multicore myopathy. As with congenital fiber type disproportion, patients have a greater number of type 1 fibers. Overall, approximately half of diagnosed individuals report no progression of muscle weakness, while half report a very slow progression.

==== Cylindrical spirals myopathy ====
Cylindrical spirals myopathy is very rare with only 18 individual cases described as of 2013. The majority of cases are sporadic, and has been observed in only 3 families. It is characterized by the presence of cylindrical spirals as the main pathological finding in muscle biopsies. Cylindrical spirals are unusual membrane structures that have a spiral pattern. These membrane structures are seen during electron microscopic examination of the affected muscle. These structures merge into or are surrounded by tubular structures that resemble tubular aggregates. Tubular aggregates are abnormal accumulations of membranous tubules and have been observed in a wide variety of muscle diseases and originate from the sarcoplasmic reticulum. Cylindrical spirals were first described in 1979 and were thought to be a non-specific reaction of skeletal muscle secondary to a metabolic disturbance or muscle fibre injury. The molecular basis of cylindrical spiral myopathy is currently unknown, however a genetic mutation affecting the sarcoplasmic reticulum in some patients seems likely, as SERCA1, calsequestrin, and RYR1 have been shown to bind to cylindrical spirals. Cylindrical spirals have also been shown to react with the mitochondrial enzyme succinate dehydrogenase, which suggests that cylindrical spirals originate from mitochondria.

Phenotypes are quite variable, and manifestations can include weakness, abnormal gait, myotonia, cramps, and scoliosis.

==== Myosin storage myopathy ====
In myosin storage myopathies, myosin accumulates beneath sarcolemma and between myofibrils, forming protein aggregates. A myopathy associated with the gene MYH7 is autosomal dominant myosin storage congenital myopathy-7A (CMYP7A).

==== Tubular aggregate myopathy ====
Although tubular aggregates are seen in a variety of myopathies, both genetic and environmental, the congenital myopathies associated with genes STIM1 and ORAI1 are known as tubular aggregate myopathy (TAM) types 1 and 2.

== Treatment ==
Currently, there are no treatments for any of the congenital myopathies. Depending on the severity, there are different therapies available to help alleviate any pain and aid patients in performing varying activities. For example, many congenital myopathy patients are involved in physical or occupational therapy in an attempt to strengthen their skeletal muscles. Orthopedic surgery is usually necessary to correct skeletal deformities secondary to muscle weakness, such as scoliosis. Survival is typically determined by the level of respiratory muscle insufficiency.
