= Antisynthetase syndrome =

Anti-synthetase syndrome
- Other names: Anti-Jo1 syndrome, AS syndrome, ASS
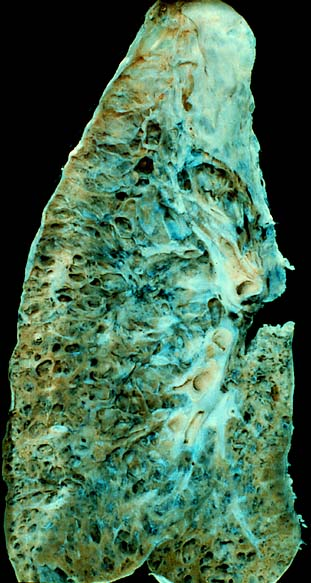
- End-stage interstitial lung disease
- Specialty: Immunology
- Symptoms: Fever, myositis, polyarthritis, interstitial lung disease, mechanic's hands, and Raynaud phenomenon.
- Differential diagnosis: Dermatomyositis, Immune-mediated necrotizing myopathy, and Polymyositis.
- Treatment: Glucocorticosteroids, immunosuppressive medications.
- Frequency: 1 in 25,000–33,000 worldwide

Antisynthetase syndrome (ASS) is a multisystem autoimmune disease associated with inflammatory myositis, interstitial lung disease, and antibodies directed against various synthetases of aminoacyl-transfer RNA. Other common symptoms include mechanic's hands, Raynaud's phenomenon, arthritis, and fever.

It is still unknown what causes interstitial lung disease associated with antisynthetase syndrome. Many antisynthetase antibodies have been reported with anti-Jo1 being the most prevalent. Pulmonary involvement is an important factor of morbidity and mortality with Antisynthetase syndrome, affecting 70–100% of patients.

Antisynthetase syndrome is diagnosed by a combination of radiologic features, clinical criteria, and identification of aminoacyl tRNA synthetase antibodies. Immunosuppressive medications such as mycophenolate mofetil, azathioprine, and tacrolimus are often used alongside corticosteroids to manage myositis and other pulmonary symptoms.

It is believed that the mortality rate for antisynthetase syndrome is significantly higher than that of the general population. The estimated cumulative ten-year survival rate for patients with different antisyntetase antibodies is 76.8%.

Antisynthetase syndrome is estimated by Orphanet to affect 1–3 people per 100,000 worldwide; however, precise data on the disease's prevalence is not available. Antisynthetase syndrome is more common in women.

== Signs and symptoms ==
67–100% of those with antisynthetase syndrome have interstitial lung disease with dyspnea and cough being the most common symptoms. Pulmonary symptoms may present early on, alongside other symptoms or they may manifest later in the progression of antisynthetase syndrome. A recent study showed that pleural involvement is often associated with antisynthetase syndrome, reporting that 42.2% patients with antisynthetase syndrome had pleural effusions.

91% of patients with antisynthetase syndrome displayed myopathic muscular weakness. Myositis is more commonly seen in those with anti-Jo1 than other antibodies. Myopathy in antisynthetase syndrome can range from subclinical to substantial proximal weakness causing difficulties climbing stairs, reaching overhead cupboards, or getting up from a seated position. 30.4–88.9% of those with antisynthetase syndrome report persistent muscular tenderness and myalgia.

In antisynthetase syndrome, arthritis is commonly described as a symmetrical, non-erosive polyarthritis of the small hands and feet that can sometimes mimic CTD-associated, rheumatoid, and seronegative inflammatory arthritis. Arthritis is non-specific and occurs in about 18–55% of Idiopathic inflammatory myopathies. Arthritis is the presenting symptom in about 24–66% of patients which can often lead to diagnostic delays. Hand X-ray lesions such as erosions, periarticular calcifications, and subluxations are seen in about 50% of patients.

Raynaud's phenomenon is an episodic vasospasm of the toes and fingers usually precipitated by exposure to cold temperatures. Raynaud's phenomenon can be primary or secondary to another disease.

The term "mechanics hands" describes the roughening and cracking of the skin on the lateral sides of the fingers, usually the thumb's ulnar border and the index finger's radial border. Interface psoriasiform dermatitis is seen on biopsy.

Dermatomyositis-like rashes are seen in 32–44% of those with antisynthetase syndrome. This includes heliotropic rash, Gottron papules, and lesions of the psoriasiform type that span the hand's dorsum and resemble the morphology of mechanics hands.

Fever is reported in 21–66% of those with antisynthetase syndrome.

Cardiac involvement such as pulmonary hypertension and myocarditis have also been reported. Other reported manifestations include sicca symptoms and dysphagia.

== Pathogenesis ==
It is postulated that autoantibodies are formed against aminoacyl-tRNA synthetases. The synthetases may be involved in recruiting antigen-presenting and inflammatory cells to the site of muscle or lung injury. The specific molecular pathway of the process awaits elucidation.

=== Antisynthetase antibodies ===
The most common antibody is "Anti-Jo-1" named after John P, a patient with polymyositis and interstitial lung disease detected in 1980. This anti-histidyl tRNA Synthetase antibody is commonly seen in patients with pulmonary manifestations of the syndrome. The following are other possible antibodies that may be seen in association with antisynthetase syndrome: Anti-PL-7, Anti-PL-12, Anti-EJ, Anti-OJ, Anti-KS, Anti-Zo, Anti-Ha (YRS, Tyr).

== Diagnosis ==
The diagnostic criteria for antisynthetase syndrome include one or more anti-synthetase antibodies as well inflammatory polyarthritis that affects the small joints, inflammatory myopathy, or interstitial lung disease.

A wide range of associated autoantibodies and myositis-specific antibodies have been found in those with idiopathic inflammatory myopathies and are often tested when evaluating idiopathic inflammatory myopathy. Anti-synthetase antibodies specific to myositis are the defining feature of anti-synthetase syndrome. Anti-histidyl-tRNA synthetase and anti-Jo-1 are the most commonly found anti-synthetase antibodies. Less common antibodies include anti-EJ, anti-OJ, anti-PL12, and anti-PL7.

The diagnosis of idiopathic interstitial lung disease can also involve testing for other myositis-specific autoantibodies such as anti-MDA5 autoantibodies, anti-Mi-2 autoantibodies, and anti-signal recognition particle autoantibodies. Autoantibodies often tested include anti-Ro/SSA, anti-nuclear antibody, anti-U1-RNP, anti-Ku, and anti-PM-Scl. Although anti-La/SSB and anti-Ro/SSA are often associated with Sjogren's syndrome they have been associated with antisynthetase syndrome and severe fibrotic idiopathic interstitial lung disease by high-resolution computed tomography.

High-resolution computed tomography is common in the management and workup of interstitial lung disease. One study showed that reticulation, ground glass opacities, and traction bronchiectasis are the most common CT scan features of antisynthetase syndrome. The presence of organizing pneumonia and non-specific interstitial pneumonia is somewhat common in antisynthetase syndrome.

Lung biopsy is rarely performed when evaluating patients with antisynthetase syndrome since the diagnosis is usually made by a combination of symptoms, physical examination, high-resolution computed tomography findings, pulmonary function tests, and serologic data. One study that analyzed the histopathologic findings using lung biopsies in patients with anti-PL7 antibodies and anti-Jo-1 antibodies found that 35% of patients had usual interstitial pneumonia and 50% had diffuse alveolar damage.

Because interstitial lung disease is the main finding and myositis is often mild, muscle biopsy is rarely performed. Although muscle biopsy is often helpful in other forms of idiopathic inflammatory myopathies, there is currently no evidence to support the use of muscle biopsy when diagnosing antisynthetase syndrome.

== Treatment ==
The first line of treatment for idiopathic inflammatory myopathies is usually corticosteroids. However, when corticosteroids are tapered down there is often lung disease recurrence. Other immunosuppressive drugs can be added as corticosteroid-sparing agents or for refractory lung and muscle disease. Cyclophosphamide, rituximab, tacrolimus, mycophenolate mofetil, and azathioprine are often used alongside corticosteroids however there is no agreement as to which medication is preferred.

No controlled trials have been performed to prove the superiority of corticosteroids compared to other immunosuppressive drugs in the treatment of antisynthetase syndrome. Those with antisynthetase syndrome often need multimodality treatment with frequent lung function monitoring.

By inhibiting purine synthesis along with incorporating metabolites into DNA, azathioprine reduces immune function by preventing replication, especially of immune cells. Azathioprine is often used in the treatment of inflammatory myopathy and interstitial lung disease, especially when there is no response to corticosteroids. Azathioprine is typically used in combination with prednisone as a maintenance therapy.

Mycophenolate mofetil changes purine synthesis to prevent lymphocytes from multiplying. It is often used after transplants to avoid rejection and is also used to treat connective tissue disorders. Studies have shown its efficacy and safety in patients with connective tissue disorders and interstitial lung disease.

Tacrolimus and cyclosporine, two calcineurin inhibitors, work against the immune system by inhibiting T cells. One study showed that when patients with anti-Jo-1 antibodies received cyclosporine they displayed improved diffusing capacity for carbon monoxide and forced vital capacity. A 1999 study reported that tacrolimus successfully treats polymyositis with interstitial lung disease. Since then, many studies have suggested that tacrolimus is successful in treating patients with connective tissue disorders and inflammatory myopathy related interstitial lung disease. It has also been used in combination with other immunosuppressive drugs and corticosteroids. In patients with antisynthetase syndrome related interstitial lung disease tacrolimus has been demonstrated to improve muscle symptoms and lung function.

Rituximab is a monoclonal antibody that specifically targets B-lymphocytes' CD20 surface antigen. One case series reported increased forced vital capacity in patients with antisynthetase syndrome-related interstitial lung disease who were treated with rituximab. Another study showed improvements in lung function and/or respiratory symptoms in patients who has interstitial lung disease due to connective tissue disorders. Half of the patients had anti-Jo-1 antibodies.

Cyclophosphamide is a cytotoxic agent that inhibits proliferation by alkylating DNA. It is usually only used to treat severe inflammatory myopathy and interstitial lung disease, especially acute respiratory distress syndrome, due to the severe nature of many of the possible side effects. Numerous case series have shown its effectiveness in treating inflammatory myopathy with and without interstitial lung disease.

Although its precise mode of action is unknown, intravenous immunoglobulin (IVIG), a blood product made up of donated blood's pooled immunoglobulin G antibodies, is used to treat a variety of autoimmune and immune deficiency diseases. Patients with dermatomyositis who received IVIG showed a significant improvement in their symptoms and muscle strength in a randomized, placebo-controlled trial of the treatment. Another case report suggests that IVIG can be effective in treating interstitial lung disease related to inflammatory myopathy.

A case study has reported that the use of CD19-targeting CAR T cell therapy (originally used to treat lymphoma and leukemia) in a patient with refractory anti-synthetase syndrome had complete clinical remission during 200 days of follow-up post-infusion when the patient received with chimeric antigen receptor (CAR) T cells that recognize CD19^{+} B cells. This shows that CD19-targeting CAR T cells could be a new therapy for patients who do not respond to the first-line immunosuppressive drugs.

If there is esophageal involvement, gastric intubation or percutaneous endoscopic gastrostomy may be required. Owing to severe interstitial lung disease, 14% of those with anti-Jo-1 or anti-PL-7 antibodies need oxygen therapy. Rarely, medication is not successful and a lung transplant is necessary. Patients with myositis should be advised to engage in individually tailored physical exercise because it lowers activity restrictions and has an anti-inflammatory effect.

== Outlook ==
Antisynthetase syndrome mortality is thought to be substantially higher than that of the general population. Patients who had various antisyntetase antibodies had an estimated cumulative ten-year survival rate of 76.8%. Respiratory complications, infectious diseases like pneumonia, cancer, cardiovascular disorders, severe myositis, and interstitial lung disease are the main causes of death amongst anti Jo-1-positive patients.

Risk factors for severe antisynthetase syndrome include calcinosis, esophageal involvement, cancer, interstitial lung disease without myositis, severe respiratory involvement, and older age at the time of diagnosis. Muscle weakness and arthritis at the point of diagnosis have been noted as favorable outcome measures.

One study reported that anti-PL-12 and anti-PL-7 antibodies were associated with a worse prognosis. A large portion of deaths occurred during the first year of onset and mostly involved those with anti-PL-7. Interstitial lung disease often led to deadly prognosis in comparison to anti-Jo1-positive patients with interstitial lung disease. Those with anti-Jo1 antibodies had less remission of myositis and more relapses than those with anti-PL-12 and anti-PL-7 antibodies. Anti-Jo-1 and anti-Ro52 antibodies co-occurring were linked to an increased risk of neoplasm, a symptomatic severe variant of interstitial lung disease, myositis, and arthritis exacerbation.

Although dermatomyositis has long been linked to an elevated risk of cancer, there is insufficient data to support this association when evaluating individuals who have antisynthetase syndrome for potential cancer. The first documented case of antisynthetase syndrome linked to cancer occurred in 2008, involving a 59-year-old patient diagnosed with colon adenocarcinoma. There have been numerous case reports along with case series since, with significantly different prevalence rates up to about 14%. The frequency of cancer within three years of the anti-synthetase syndrome diagnosis was only 1.7% in a more comprehensive retrospective analysis involving 233 patients with the condition, which the authors claim was not significantly different from the population as a whole. Age-appropriate cancer screening should be followed by healthcare providers for these patients, according to these studies, but there is no evidence to support further or non-guideline-based assessments. Case reports have shown that treating the underlying cancer can improve myositis as well as interstitial lung disease, which supports the theory that idiopathic inflammatory myopathy may be a paraneoplastic syndrome.

== Epidemiology ==
Orphanet estimates that the global rate of antisynthetase syndrome is 1–9/100 000; however, exact information regarding the disease's prevalence is not available. 11.1% to 39.19% of those with idiopathic inflammatory myopathy have antisynthetase antibodies. The EuroMyositis registry indicates that antisynthetase syndrome is more common than immune-mediated necrotizing myopathy and sporadic inclusion body myositis, but less common than dermatomyositis and polymyositis. Similar to other subtypes of idiopathic inflammatory myopathy, except for sporadic inclusion body myositis, antisynthetase syndrome is more common in women, with an estimated female-to-male ratio of roughly 7:3. In patients with dermatomyositis and polymyositis, the mean age at disease onset is 48 years, which is older than in patients with immune-mediated necrotizing myopathy and sporadic inclusion body myositis.
