= MI-2 =

MI-2 or Mi-2 can refer to:

- Michigan's 2nd congressional district
- Mil Mi-2, a light helicopter
- Mission: Impossible 2, a 2000 action spy film
- Anti-Mi-2 antibodies
- Mi-2 complex, also known as NuRD (nucleosome remodeling deacetylase) complex
