= Exercise therapy for idiopathic inflammatory myopathies =

Although they vary in particulars, polymyositis, dermatomyositis and inclusion body myositis are idiopathic inflammatory myopathies (IIM) primarily characterized by chronic inflammation of human skeletal muscle tissue that ultimately causes the necrosis of muscle cells. This degeneration leads to muscle tissue wasting, weakness and fatigue among other serious effects. Until recently, exercise has been avoided as a type of therapy, and even forbidden due to the risk of triggering or amplifying inflammation. However, several studies have been conducted to test this assumption and have shown that aerobic exercise as well as resistance training can maintain and even improve the quality of life for IIM-affected individuals without increased inflammatory response.

== Modes of exercise therapy: trials ==
With the main goals of treatment being improved functionality and quality of life, exercise programs should focus on "functional" exercises (e.g. walking, walking up/down stairs, sit-to-stand), when applicable. Performing functional exercises increases (a) the efficiency of the exercise program and (b) the likelihood the improvements will be transferred to activities of daily living.

=== Isometric activity ===
In 1993, isometric exercise training was applied for four weeks resulting in isometric peak power at 60% of maximal voluntary contraction. The increase in isometric power was later shown to have no significant effect on serum creatine kinase (CK) after two weeks of strength training.

=== Aerobic activity ===
A six-week training program in 1998 that included 30 minutes of aerobic activity three times per week set at 60% maximum heart rate (predicted by age) resulted in increased VO_{2} max (i.e. maximal oxygen consumption or aerobic capacity), diminished pain, reduced muscle impairment, and improved quality of life.

=== Weight-bearing activity ===
The results produced by aerobic activity were repeated in 1999 where for 12 weeks, weight-bearing exercise was added for patients not exhibiting marked physical incapacity as measured by the Functional Index in Myositis (see Functional Assessment section). Confirmed by MRI and muscle biopsy, both the 1998 and 1999 studies showed that there were no significant changes in levels of creatine kinase and aldolase, and no increase in muscle inflammation. In 2001, 22 patients were placed on a three-week physical therapy and exercise program, and found that creatine kinase levels actually dropped in 20 of the patients.

The longest study to date was a six-month exercise program demonstrating a significant improvement in exercise capacity, VO_{2}, isokinetic strength, and the ability to perform daily tasks compared to controls.

=== Stretching and range of motion activity ===
Chest expansion and thoracic extension exercises may offer preventive support to those at risk of restrictive lung disease through the effects of IIM, and patients with inclusion body myositis may also be able to prevent contracture and extend functional daily activities through stretching and range of motion exercises.

== Monitoring ==
It is important to recognize that all described exercise programs were conducted by physicians or physiotherapists during the stable phase of the disease (except Painelli). Patients were monitored closely for indicators of deleterious effects, such as increases in serum creatine kinase, inflammation or weakness. Monitoring of this kind can only be done in conjunction with a medical team that is aware of the risks posed by increased inflammatory response in patients with IIM.

== Future research ==
The pathophysiology of IIMs is not well understood. Muscle weakness can be caused by a single or combined effect on muscle tissue by inflammation, inflammatory infiltrates, muscle atrophy, metabolic abnormalities that indicate disordered energy metabolism, and possibly neuropathy, among others. Therefore, physical exercise has the potential to cause harm.

However, the results of these exercise studies, at minimum, show that exercise can attenuate muscle damage due to disease, inactivity and steroid use. They reflect the benefit of exercise through the strengthening of complement (non-diseased) muscles, and should encourage further studies to confirm whether diseased muscle may experience regeneration. The definition of improvement must be established, and reproducible longitudinal studies must be conducted to determine the efficacy of exercise as therapy for IIM.
