= Immune-mediated necrotizing myopathy =

Subgroup of the idiopathic inflammatory myopathies

Immune-mediated necrotizing myopathy (IMNM) is a subgroup of the idiopathic inflammatory myopathies. There are three major subtypes based on autoantibodies, of which statin-associated autoimmune myopathy has been increasing in recent years. It is characterized by myopathological findings of multiple necrotic and regenerating fibers with little infiltration of inflammatory cells.

== Epidemiology ==
As many as 40% of patients previously diagnosed with polymyositis and 19% of "possible myositis" would be classified as IMNM, but with the increase in the use of statins in 2010s, the number of cases of immune-mediated necrotizing myopathy has also increased. It is considered that 20-40% of myositis cases are immune-mediated necrotizing myopathy.

== Classification ==
Depending on the autoantibody detected, it is classified into three major subtypes: anti-SRP antibody-positive immune-mediated necrotizing myopathy (30-40%), anti-HMGCR antibody-positive immune-mediated necrotizing myopathy (26-50%), and seronegative immune-mediated necrotizing myopathy (25-40%).
