= Limb girdle syndrome =

Limb girdle syndrome is any of several distinct medical conditions including polymyositis, myopathy associated with endocrine disease, metabolic myopathy, drug-induced myopathy and limb-girdle muscular dystrophy.

Limb girdle syndrome is weakness located and concentrated around the proximal limb muscles. There are many causes, manifestations and treatments.
