= Polymyositis =

Chronic muscular inflammation, primarily of the endomysium

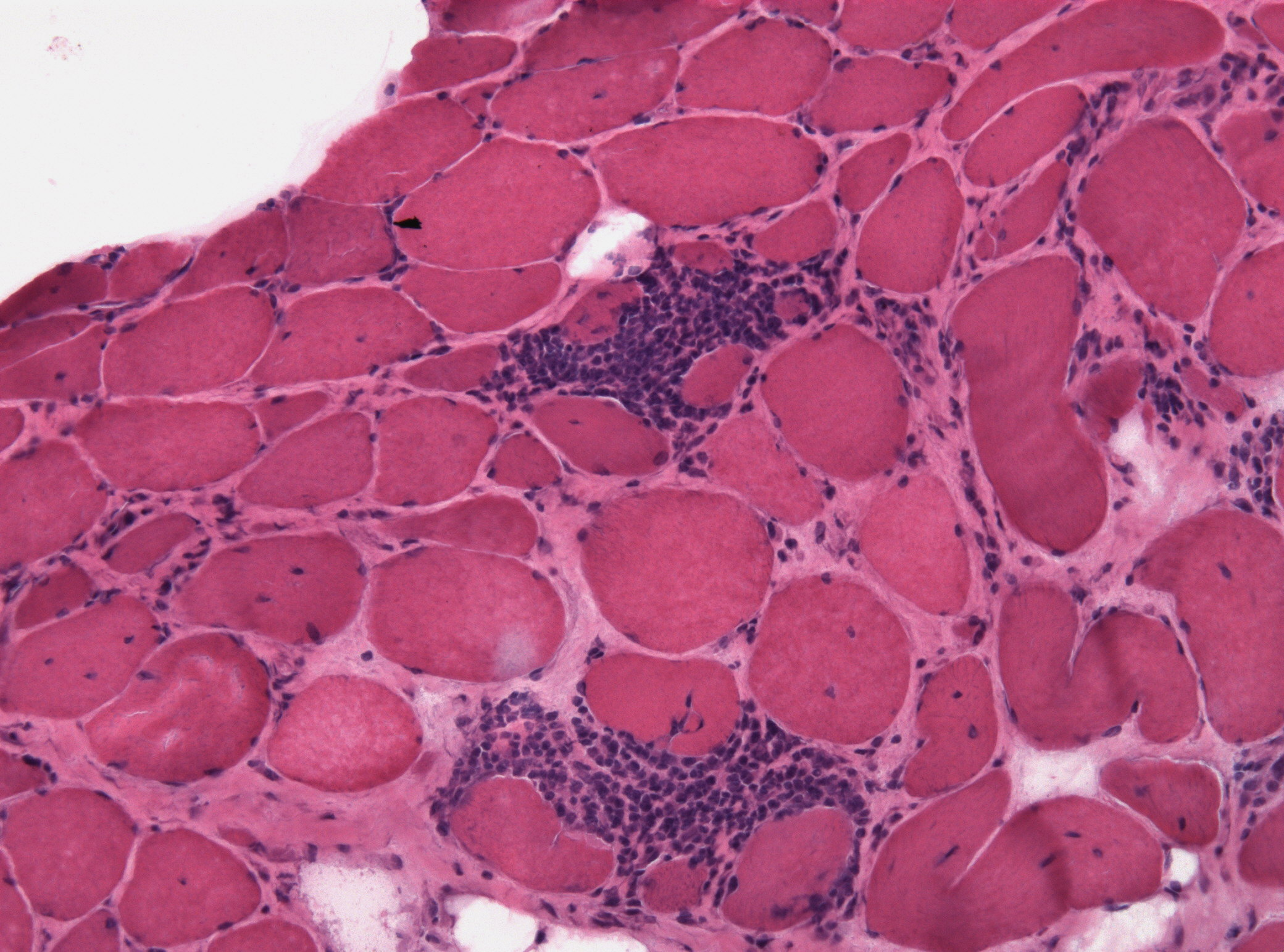
- Micrograph of polymyositis. Muscle biopsy. H&E stain.
- Specialty: Rheumatology
- Frequency: 0.0072%

Polymyositis (PM) is a type of chronic inflammation of the muscles (inflammatory myopathy) related to dermatomyositis and inclusion body myositis. Its name is derived from poly- 'many', myos- 'muscle' and -itis 'inflammation'. The inflammation of polymyositis is mainly found in the endomysial layer of skeletal muscle, whereas dermatomyositis is characterized primarily by inflammation of the perimysial layer of skeletal muscles.

== Signs and symptoms ==
The hallmark of polymyositis is weakness and/or loss of muscle mass in the proximal musculature, as well as flexion of the neck and torso. These symptoms can be associated with marked pain in these areas as well. The hip extensors are often severely affected, leading to particular difficulty in climbing stairs and rising from a seated position. The skin involvement of dermatomyositis is absent in polymyositis. Dysphagia (difficulty swallowing) or other problems with esophageal motility occur in as many as 1/3 of patients. Low grade fever and enlarged lymph nodes may be present. Foot drop in one or both feet can be a symptom of advanced polymyositis and inclusion body myositis. The systemic involvement of polymyositis includes interstitial lung disease (ILD) and heart disease, such as heart failure and conduction abnormalities.

Polymyositis tends to become evident in adulthood, presenting with bilateral proximal muscle weakness often noted in the upper legs due to early fatigue while walking. Sometimes the weakness presents itself as an inability to rise from a seated position without help or an inability to raise one's arms above one's head. The weakness is generally progressive, accompanied by lymphocytic inflammation (mainly cytotoxic T cells).

=== Associated illnesses ===
Polymyositis and the associated inflammatory myopathies have an associated increased risk of cancer. The features they found associated with an increased risk of cancer were older age, age greater than 45, male sex, difficulty swallowing, death of skin cells, cutaneous vasculitis, rapid onset of myositis (<4 weeks), elevated creatine kinase, higher erythrocyte sedimentation rate and higher C-reactive protein levels. Several factors were associated with lower-than-average risk, including the presence of interstitial lung disease, joint inflammation/joint pain, Raynaud's syndrome, or anti-Jo-1 antibody. The malignancies that are associated are nasopharyngeal cancer, lung cancer, non-Hodgkin's lymphoma and bladder cancer, amongst others.

Cardiac involvement manifests itself typically as heart failure and is present in up to 77% of patients. Interstitial lung disease is found in up to 65% of patients with polymyositis, as defined by HRCT or restrictive ventilatory defects compatible with interstitial lung disease.

== Causes ==
Polymyositis is an inflammatory myopathy mediated by cytotoxic T cells with an as yet unknown autoantigen, while dermatomyositis is a humorally mediated angiopathy resulting in myositis and a typical dermatitis.

The cause of polymyositis is unknown and may involve viruses and autoimmune factors. Cancer may trigger polymyositis and dermatomyositis, possibly through an immune reaction against cancer that also attacks a component of muscles. There is tentative evidence of an association with celiac disease.

== Diagnosis ==
Diagnosis is fourfold: History and physical examination, elevation of creatine kinase, electromyograph (EMG) alteration, and a positive muscle biopsy.

The hallmark clinical feature of polymyositis is proximal muscle weakness, with less important findings being muscle pain and dysphagia. Cardiac and pulmonary findings will be present in approximately 25% of cases of patients with polymyositis.

Sporadic inclusion body myositis (sIBM) is often misdiagnosed as polymyositis or dermatomyositis but it can be differentiated as myositis that does not respond to treatment is likely IBM. sIBM comes on over months to years; polymyositis comes on over weeks to months. Polymyositis tends to respond well to treatment, at least initially; IBM does not.

=== Differential diagnosis ===
The clinical criteria of meeting a polymyositis diagnosis are non-specific, and a plethora of disorders can present with similar findings such as proximal muscle weakness, changes in lab findings (like an increase in creatine kinase), EMG findings, and muscle biopsy results. The following categories summarize common and uncommon alternative diagnoses, but this list is not exhaustive.

==== Inflammatory and systemic autoimmune disorders ====
Conditions that may closely resemble polymyositis include dermatomyositis, inclusion body myositis, immune-mediated necrotizing myopathy, systemic lupus erythematous, systemic sclerosis, and Sjögren syndrome. Overlapping skin features, such as facial redness/flushing in lupus, is an example of how these conditions can cause clinical confusion when diagnosing.

==== Neuromuscular and inherited muscle disorders ====
Other conditions that may be confused with polymyositis include amyotrophic lateral sclerosis, chronic spinal muscular atrophy, myasthenia gravis, and inherited metabolic myopathies such as McArdle disease.

==== Endocrine and metabolic disorders ====
Several endocrine conditions can cause proximal muscle weakness and laboratory abnormalities that mimic inflammatory myopathy. This includes thyroid issues (hypothyroidism or hyperthyroidism), where your thyroid hormones are either too high or too low. Also, it’s important to consider Cushing syndrome and acromegaly.

==== Infectious causes ====
Parasitic infections, like Trichinella infection and sarcocystosis for example, may present with muscle pain, weakness, and inflammatory changes too. Viruses such as the influenza virus, also known as ‘the flu,’ can also cause muscle pain/weakness.

==== Drug and toxin-associated myopathies ====
Medication-related muscle disease is an important diagnostic consideration. Myopathy may occur with corticosteroids, amiodarone, cyclosporine, statins, colchicine, chloroquine or hydroxychloroquine, and chronic alcohol exposure just to name a few. Some of these agents can produce muscle biopsy findings that partially overlap with inflammatory myopathies. In individuals with human immunodeficiency virus infection, both HIV-associated myopathy and antiretroviral drug toxicity may contribute to diagnostic uncertainty.

==== Electrolyte imbalances ====
Electrolytes like Na, K, Ca, and P can all cause mimicking symptoms when high or low. Most commonly, hypokalemia, or low K, is the culprit, since many common drugs decrease this electrolyte.

==== Other potential causes ====
Additional conditions that may present with similar clinical features include polymyalgia rheumatica, diabetic lumbosacral plexopathy, spinal stenosis, and non-inflammatory pain syndromes such as fibromyalgia.

== Treatment ==
The first line treatment for polymyositis is corticosteroids. Specialized exercise therapy may supplement treatment to enhance quality of life.

== Epidemiology ==
Polymyositis affects females at greater frequency than males.

== Polymyositis as a distinct diagnosis ==
The discovery of several myositis-specific autoantibodies during the past decades has enabled the description of other discrete subsets of diagnosis, specifically the discovery of Antisynthetase syndrome in reducing the number of diagnoses of polymyositis.

== Society and culture ==
=== Notable cases ===
- Dan Christensen, painter of abstract art. Died due to heart failure caused by polymyositis.
- Robert Erickson, American composer and teacher who was a leading modernist exponent of "12-tone" composition. Died from the effects of polymyositis.
- Ana Estrada, the first person in Peru to die by euthanasia on 21 April 2024, at the age of 47.
- David Lean, film director.
- Eric Samuelsen, playwright.
- Victor Manuel Resendiz Ruiz, wrestler.
- Cardinal John Wright
- Rosita Velazquez, Puerto Rican actress and singer.

== See also ==
- Limb girdle syndrome
