= Weakness =

Physical symptom

- Other names: Asthenia
- Specialty: Neurology

Weakness is a symptom of many different medical conditions. The causes are many and can be divided into conditions that have true or perceived muscle weakness. True muscle weakness is a primary symptom of a variety of skeletal muscle diseases, including muscular dystrophy and inflammatory myopathy. It occurs in neuromuscular junction disorders, such as myasthenia gravis.

== Pathophysiology ==
Muscle cells work by detecting a flow of electrical impulses from the brain, which signals them to contract through the release of calcium by the sarcoplasmic reticulum. Fatigue (reduced ability to generate force) may occur due to the nerve, or within the muscle cells themselves. New research from scientists at Columbia University suggests that muscle fatigue is caused by calcium leaking out of the muscle cell. This makes less calcium available for the muscle cell. In addition, the Columbia researchers propose that an enzyme activated by this released calcium eats away at muscle fibers.

Substrates within the muscle generally serve to power muscular contractions. They include molecules such as adenosine triphosphate (ATP), glycogen and creatine phosphate. ATP binds to the myosin head and causes the 'ratchetting' that results in contraction according to the sliding filament model. Creatine phosphate stores energy so ATP can be rapidly regenerated within the muscle cells from adenosine diphosphate (ADP) and inorganic phosphate ions, allowing for sustained powerful contractions that last between 5–7 seconds. Glycogen is the intramuscular storage form of glucose, used to generate energy quickly once intramuscular creatine stores are exhausted, producing lactic acid as a metabolic byproduct. Contrary to common belief, lactic acid accumulation doesn't actually cause the burning sensation felt when people exhaust their oxygen and oxidative metabolism, but in actuality, lactic acid in presence of oxygen recycles to produce pyruvate in the liver, which is known as the Cori cycle.

Substrates produce metabolic fatigue by being depleted during exercise, resulting in a lack of intracellular energy sources to fuel contractions. In essence, the muscle stops contracting because it lacks the energy to do so.

== Differential diagnosis ==
=== True vs. perceived weakness ===
- True weakness (or neuromuscular) describes a condition where the force exerted by the muscles is less than would be expected, for example muscular dystrophy.
- Perceived weakness (or non-neuromuscular) describes a condition where a person feels more effort than normal is required to exert a given amount of force but actual muscle strength is normal, for example.

In some conditions, such as myasthenia gravis, muscle strength is normal when resting, but true weakness occurs after the muscle has been subjected to exercise. This is also true for some cases of Myalgic encephalomyelitis/chronic fatigue syndrome, where objective post-exertion muscle weakness with delayed recovery time has been measured and is a feature of some of the published definitions.

=== Asthenia vs. myasthenia ===
Asthenia or asthaenia (Greek: ἀσθένεια, literally lack of strength but also disease) is a medical term referring to a condition in which the body lacks or has lost strength either as a whole or in any of its parts. It is a poorly defined condition that can include true or primary muscle weakness or perceived muscle weakness. For perceived muscle weakness, asthenia has been described as the feeling of weak or tired muscles in the absence of muscle weakness, that is the muscle can generate a normal amount of force but it is perceived as requiring more effort.

General asthenia occurs in many chronic wasting diseases (such as tuberculosis and cancer), sleep disorders or chronic disorders of the heart, lungs or kidneys, and is probably most marked in diseases of the adrenal gland. Moreover, asthenia can be a symptom of mast cell activation syndrome (MCAS). Asthenia may be limited to certain organs or systems of organs, as in asthenopia, characterized by ready fatiguability. Asthenia is also a side effect of some medications and treatments, such as Ritonavir (a protease inhibitor used in HIV treatment).

Differentiating psychogenic (perceived) asthenia and true asthenia from myasthenia is often difficult, and in time apparent psychogenic asthenia accompanying many chronic disorders is seen to progress into a primary weakness.

Myasthenia or myasthaenia (my- from Greek: μυο meaning "muscle" + -asthenia [ἀσθένεια] meaning "weakness"), or simply muscle weakness, is a lack of muscle strength. The causes are many and can be divided into conditions that have either true or perceived muscle weakness. True muscle weakness is a primary symptom of a variety of skeletal muscle diseases, including muscular dystrophy and inflammatory myopathy. It occurs in neuromuscular diseases, such as myasthenia gravis. Perceived muscle weakness occurs in diseases such as sleep disorders, and depression.

=== Types ===
Muscle fatigue can be central, neuromuscular, or peripheral muscular. Central muscle fatigue manifests as an overall sense of energy deprivation, and peripheral muscle weakness manifests as a local, muscle-specific inability to do work. Neuromuscular fatigue can be either central or peripheral.

==== Central fatigue ====
The central fatigue is generally described in terms of a reduction in the neural drive or nerve-based motor command to working muscles that results in a decline in the force output. It has been suggested that the reduced neural drive during exercise may be a protective mechanism to prevent organ failure if the work was continued at the same intensity. The exact mechanisms of central fatigue are unknown, though there has been considerable interest in the role of serotonergic pathways.

==== Neuromuscular fatigue ====
Nerves control the contraction of muscles by determining the number, sequence, and force of muscular contraction. When a nerve experiences synaptic fatigue it becomes unable to stimulate the muscle that it innervates. Most movements require a force far below what a muscle could potentially generate, and barring pathology, neuromuscular fatigue is seldom an issue.

For extremely powerful contractions that are close to the upper limit of a muscle's ability to generate force, neuromuscular fatigue can become a limiting factor in untrained individuals. In novice strength trainers, the muscle's ability to generate force is most strongly limited by nerve's ability to sustain a high-frequency signal. After an extended period of maximum contraction, the nerve's signal reduces in frequency and the force generated by the contraction diminishes. There is no sensation of pain or discomfort, the muscle appears to simply 'stop listening' and gradually cease to move, often lengthening. As there is insufficient stress on the muscles and tendons, there will often be no delayed onset muscle soreness following the workout. Part of the process of strength training is increasing the nerve's ability to generate sustained, high frequency signals which allow a muscle to contract with their greatest force. It is this "neural training" that causes several weeks worth of rapid gains in strength, which level off once the nerve is generating maximum contractions and the muscle reaches its physiological limit. Past this point, training effects increase muscular strength through myofibrillar or sarcoplasmic hypertrophy and metabolic fatigue becomes the factor limiting contractile force.

==== Peripheral muscle fatigue ====
Peripheral muscle fatigue during physical work is considered an inability for the body to supply sufficient energy or other metabolites to the contracting muscles to meet the increased energy demand. This is the most common case of physical fatigue—affecting a national average of 72% of adults in the work force in 2002. This causes contractile dysfunction that manifests in the eventual reduction or lack of ability of a single muscle or local group of muscles to do work. The insufficiency of energy, i.e. sub-optimal aerobic metabolism, generally results in the accumulation of lactic acid and other acidic anaerobic metabolic by-products in the muscle, causing the stereotypical burning sensation of local muscle fatigue, though recent studies have indicated otherwise, actually finding that lactic acid is a source of energy.

The fundamental difference between the peripheral and central theories of muscle fatigue is that the peripheral model of muscle fatigue assumes failure at one or more sites in the chain that initiates muscle contraction. Peripheral regulation therefore depends on the localized metabolic chemical conditions of the local muscle affected, whereas the central model of muscle fatigue is an integrated mechanism that works to preserve the integrity of the system by initiating muscle fatigue through muscle derecruitment, based on collective feedback from the periphery, before cellular or organ failure occurs. Therefore, the feedback that is read by this central regulator could include chemical and mechanical as well as cognitive cues. The significance of each of these factors will depend on the nature of the fatigue-inducing work that is being performed.

Though not universally used, "metabolic fatigue" is a common alternative term for peripheral muscle weakness, because of the reduction in contractile force due to the direct or indirect effects of the reduction of substrates or accumulation of metabolites within the myocytes. This can occur through a simple lack of energy to fuel contraction, or through interference with the ability of Ca^{2+} to stimulate actin and myosin to contract.
