= Inflammatory myopathy =

Muscular inflammatory disease of unknown origin

- Other names: Idiopathic inflammatory myopathy
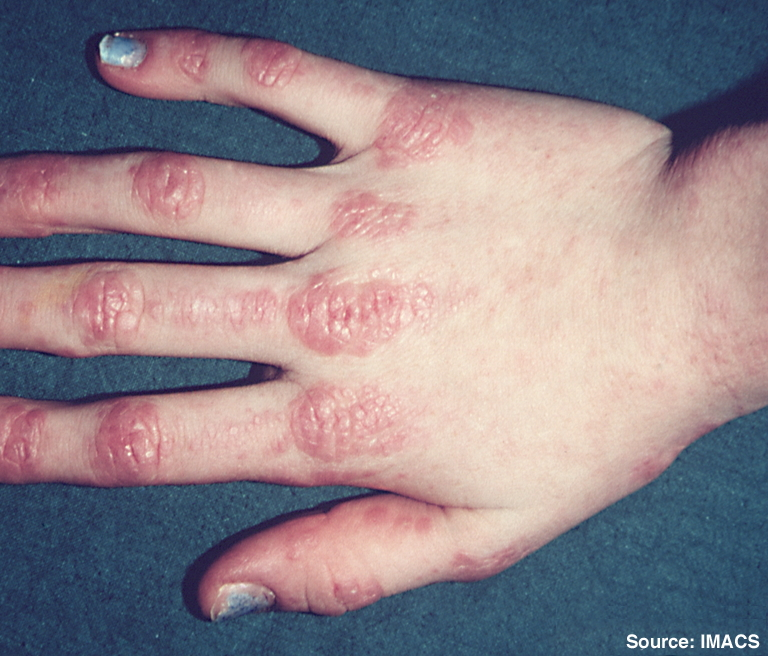
- Gottron's papules on the hand of a patient with juvenile dermatomyositis
- Specialty: Rheumatology

Inflammatory myopathy (IM), is a collection of autoimmune systemic diseases characterised by muscle inflammation, and frequently accompanied by extramuscular manifestations affecting the skin, lung, and joints. The main classes of inflammatory myopathy are dermatomyositis (DM) (including juvenile, amyopathic, and sine-dermatitis form), the antisynthetase syndrome (ASyS), inclusion-body myositis (IBM), immune-mediated necrotising myopathy (IMNM). Polymyositis (PM) is nowadays a diagnosis of exclusion.

== Etiology ==
The etiology of myositis is thought to involve an interaction between genetic susceptibility, environmental exposures, infections, medications, malignancy, and autoimmune responses. Different subtypes are associated with distinct clinical, histological, molecular, and autoantibody profiles.Several triggers have been implicated. Ultraviolet radiation has been associated with dermatomyositis, while dust and air pollutants have been linked to inflammatory myopathy risk. Viral infections may contribute to some forms of disease, particularly anti-MDA5 dermatomyositis with interstitial lung disease, which shows seasonal clustering. Cancer is strongly associated with some forms of dermatomyositis, especially anti-TIF1γ-positive disease, in which tumor mutations may initiate an immune response that later cross-reacts with regenerating muscle and skin. Drug exposures can also trigger myositis; statins are associated with anti-HMGCR immune-mediated necrotizing myopathy, and immune checkpoint inhibitors can induce several transcriptomically and histologically distinct forms of myositis. Finally, bone marrow transplant can induce IM.

Genetic predisposition is also important, particularly variation in human leukocyte antigen genes. Specific HLA alleles are associated with autoantibody-defined subgroups.

== Pathogenesis ==
Recent studies suggest that the pathogenesis of several non-IBM forms of IM are driven by the pathogenic internalization of autoantibodies. Although these antibodies target intracellular proteins, evidence indicates that they can enter different cell types and disrupt the function of their target autoantigens causing inflammation and damage. For example, anti-Mi-2 autoantibodies bind PHD-containing proteins, including component of the NuRD complex, inducing derepression of multiple genes; anti-PM/Scl antibodies impair the nuclear RNA exosome complex, leading to accumulation of long non-coding RNAs and divergent transcripts; anti-HMGCR autoantibodies disrupt the enzymatic function of HMGCR, inducing accumulation of neutral lipids; and anti-Jo-1 antibodies interfere with histidyl-tRNA synthetase function. In anti-MDA5 dermatomyositis, autoantibodies activate MDA5 and contribute to activation of type I interferon pathways.

The type I interferon pathway is especially prominent in dermatomyositis and has become a major therapeutic target. Clinical responses to JAK inhibitors, anti-IFNβ therapy, and agents targeting the interferon receptor support the importance of this pathway in disease activity. Conversely, a negative trial of complement inhibition in immune-mediated necrotizing myopathy has challenged earlier models in which complement-mediated muscle injury was considered central to that subtype.

Inclusion body myositis remains the least well-understood form of myositis. Its pathogenesis is thought to involve both inflammatory and degenerative mechanisms, including cytotoxic T-cell infiltration, which in many cases fulfills criteria for large granular lymphocytic leukemia, as well as TDP-43 dysfunction characterized by nuclear depletion, cytoplasmic mislocalization, and the appearance of cryptic exons. Anti-NT5C1A autoantibodies are detected in some patients, but they are not specific for inclusion body myositis, and their pathogenic significance remains uncertain. Overall, no single unifying pathogenic mechanism has been established.

== Diagnosis ==
There are several diagnostic and classification criteria for the different forms of myositis. Most contemporary approaches integrate clinical features with autoantibody testing and other complementary investigations. Some criteria are broad and support a syndromic diagnosis, such as DM or IMNM, whereas others are more granular and allow identification of autoantibody-defined entities.In patients with compatible clinical features, several diagnostic tests can help establish the diagnosis and distinguish among the different forms of myositis. Muscle enzymes, such as creatine kinase and aldolase, are released into the circulation when muscle fibers are damaged. They are useful markers of muscle necrosis and are often the first laboratory abnormality suggesting inflammatory myositis.

Myositis-specific and myositis-associated autoantibodies have emerged as key diagnostic markers. In combination with characteristic clinical features, they may be sufficient to diagnose certain forms of inflammatory myositis, even in the absence of confirmatory tests such as muscle biopsy. Muscle biopsy remains particularly useful when specific autoantibodies are absent, when the clinical picture is atypical, or when alternative diagnoses need to be excluded.

Electromyography can help identify myopathic changes consistent with myositis and exclude neuropathic processes. Muscle MRI is useful for distinguishing active inflammation from chronic damage and for selecting an appropriate biopsy site. Muscle ultrasound can also detect muscle inflammation and, in specialized centers, may be used to support diagnosis, monitor disease progression, and guide biopsy site selection.Nailfold videocapillaroscopy, which assesses abnormalities of the nailbed capillaries, is useful for detecting microvascular changes in myositis and may also help monitor treatment response. Dynamometry provides a more objective assessment of muscle strength and can be useful for evaluating disease severity and tracking changes over time.

=== Differential diagnosis ===
IM should be distinguished from a broad range of conditions that can present with similar clinical features, including infections, muscle trauma, medications and toxins, inherited and metabolic myopathies, neuromuscular junction disorders (such as Lambert–Eaton myasthenic syndrome and myasthenia gravis), and systemic autoimmune diseases, including systemic sclerosis, systemic lupus erythematosus and sarcoidosis.

== Treatment ==
Multiple effective therapies are available for the treatment of non-IBM forms of IM. Standard treatment typically consists of a combination of glucocorticoids and steroid-sparing immunosuppressive agents, including methotrexate, mycophenolate mofetil, azathioprine, tacrolimus, and cyclosporine. Intravenous immunoglobulin (IVIG) has demonstrated efficacy in DM and is widely used to control disease activity across several IM subtypes. Although rituximab did not meet its primary endpoint in randomized clinical trials, it remains an important treatment option in clinical practice, particularly for refractory disease, often in combination with IVIG.

More recently, Janus kinase (JAK) inhibitors, including tofacitinib, ruxolitinib, baricitinib, and brepocitinib, have shown efficacy in dermatomyositis. Additional strategies targeting the type I interferon pathway have also demonstrated benefit, including blockade of interferon-β with dazukibart.

Deep B-cell depletion with CD19 chimeric antigen receptor (CAR) T-cell therapy has shown preliminary evidence of inducing sustained, and potentially treatment-free, remission in IM. Similarly, plasma cell–targeted therapies, including CAR T-cell approaches and monoclonal antibodies, as well as inhibitors of the neonatal Fc receptor (FcRn), such as efgartigimod, have emerged as promising therapeutic strategies for IM.Overall, with timely diagnosis and appropriate treatment, the prognosis of DM, ASyS, IMNM, and other non-IBM inflammatory myopathies is generally favorable.

=== Inclusion-body myositis ===
Despite its clinical similarities to other forms of IM, IBM does not respond to therapies that are effective in other IM subtypes, and no treatment has yet been proven to alter its disease course. Numerous therapeutic agents have been evaluated in clinical trials, including methotrexate, IVIG, alemtuzumab, bimagrumab, sirolimus, arimoclomol, and ulviprubart but none has demonstrated definitive clinical efficacy. Non-fatiguing, systematic strength-building exercise has demonstrated benefit. Occupational and rehabilitation therapists can offer good advice on walking without falling and performing fine motor tasks, and can provide appropriate canes, braces and wheelchairs. Speech pathologists can provide advice on preventing choking episodes and reducing the anxiety of an immanent aspiration for both patients and carers.

== Epidemiology ==
Every year between 2.18 and 7.7 people per million receive a diagnosis of PM or DM. Around 3.2 children per million per year are diagnosed with DM (termed juvenile dermatomyositis), with an average age of onset of seven years. Diagnosis of adult DM commonly occurs between 30 and 50 years of age. PM is an adult disease, usually emerging after the age of twenty. PM and DM are more common in females, more common in Caucasians, and least common in Asians. At any given time, about 35.5 people per million have IBM; it emerges after the age of 30 (usually after 50), and may be more common in males.

== See also ==
- Acquired non-inflammatory myopathy
- Myositis
