= NT5C1A =

Protein-coding gene in humans

Identifiers
- Aliases: NT5C1A, CN-I, CN-IA, CN1, CN1A, CNI, 5'-nucleotidase, cytosolic IA
- External IDs: OMIM: 610525; MGI: 2155700; GeneCards: NT5C1A
Enzyme activity
EC #	BRENDA	ExPASy	KEGG	MetaCyc
3.1.3.5	↗	↗	↗	↗
3.1.3.89	↗	↗	↗	↗
3.1.3.99	↗	↗	↗	↗

Gene location (Human)
Chr.	Chromosome 1 (human)
Band	1p34.2	Start	39,651,229 bp
Band	1p34.2	End	39,672,107 bp

Gene location (Mouse)
Chr.	Chromosome 4 (mouse)
Band	4|4 D2.2	Start	123,095,297 bp
Band	4|4 D2.2	End	123,110,068 bp
RNA expression pattern
Bgee	Human / Mouse (ortholog); Top expressed in: gastrocnemius muscle; testicle; muscle of thigh; apex of heart; striated muscle tissue; skeletal muscle tissue; right atrium; right auricle of heart; left ventricle; cerebellar cortex / Top expressed in: muscle of thigh; skeletal muscle tissue; quadriceps femoris muscle; adrenal gland; cerebellum; cerebellar cortex; hippocampus proper; dentate gyrus of hippocampal formation granule cell; circulatory system; heart; More reference expression data
BioGPS	n/a
Gene ontology
Molecular function	nucleotide binding; hydrolase activity; magnesium ion binding; protein binding; 5'-nucleotidase activity
Cellular component	cytoplasm; cytosol
Biological process	nucleoside metabolic process; adenosine metabolic process; purine nucleotide catabolic process; nucleotide metabolic process; pyrimidine nucleoside catabolic process; dephosphorylation; purine nucleoside monophosphate catabolic process
Sources:Amigo / QuickGO
Orthologs
Databases	NCBI: entry; OMA: entry
Species	Human	Mouse
Entrez	84618	230718
Ensembl	ENSG00000116981	ENSMUSG00000054958
UniProt	Q9BXI3	A3KFX0
RefSeq (mRNA)	NM_032526	NM_001085502
RefSeq (protein)	NP_115915	NP_001078971
Location (UCSC)	Chr 1: 39.65 – 39.67 Mb	Chr 4: 123.1 – 123.11 Mb
PubMed search
- Wikidata
View/Edit Human	View/Edit Mouse

5'-nucleotidase, cytosolic IA is a protein that in humans is encoded by the NT5C1A gene.

== Function ==
Cytosolic nucleotidases, such as NT5C1A, dephosphorylate nucleoside monophosphates.
