= Gottron's sign =

Medical sign

Gottron's sign is a pathognomonic cutaneous manifestation associated with dermatomyositis (DM), which is an inflammatory disorder affecting the skin and muscles. The primary lesion of dermatomyositis appears as a violaceous, macular erythema with a symmetric distribution, which may progress and become poikilodermatous (atrophic with telangiectasia and pigmentary changes) and indurated (as a result of mucin deposition). They were first described by Heinrich Adolf Gottron.

== Gottron's papules ==
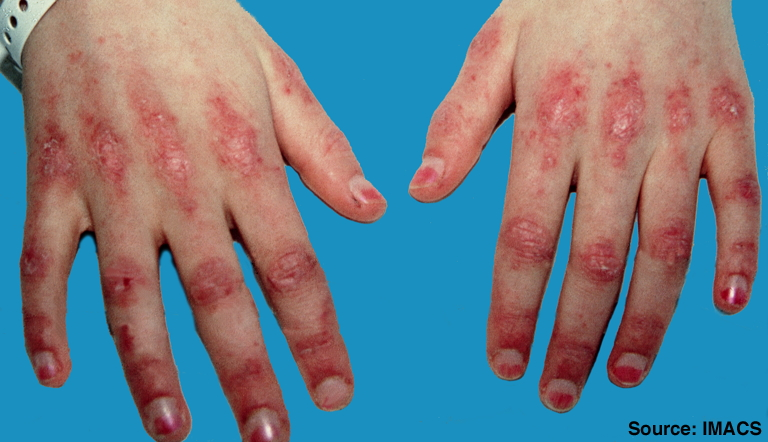
Gottron's papules. Erythematous to violaceous raised papules overlying the metacarpal and interphalangeal joints in a patient with juvenile dermatomyositis.

Gottron's papules are violaceous erythematous papules that commonly occur overlying the dorsal interphalangeal (DIP) or metacarpophalangeal joints (MCP), as well as the elbows or knee joints. They are found in approximately 70 percent of patients diagnosed with dermatomyositis.

== Gottron's sign ==
Gottron's sign is erythematous or violaceous macules or plaques overlying the elbows and/or knees, and it is considered a less specific finding for DM. The macules or plaques follow the same symmetric distribution pattern as Gottron's papules but do not appear in the interphalangeal spaces. This is a contrasting dermatologic distribution pattern to what is observed in patients with systemic lupus erythematosus.

== Differential diagnosis ==
Primary dermatomyositis	Secondary dermatomyositis	Not dermatomyositis
Classic adult dermatomyositis	Drug induced (Statins, NSAID, chemotherapeutics, antibiotics)	Lupus
Paraneoplastic dermatomyositis	Infection induced (HIV, HSV)	Lichen planus
Amyopathic dermatomyositis		Psoriasis
Juvenile dermatomyositis		Polymorphous light eruption
"overlap syndrome" dermatomyositis		Granuloma annulare
		Dermatitis (contact, seborrheic, atopic)
		Trauma-induced knuckles
