= Statin-associated autoimmune myopathy =

Statin-associated Autoimmune Myopathy
- Other names: Anti-HmG Coenzyme A Reductase Myopathy, Immune-mediated necrotizing myopathy associated with statins, Statin-associated immune-mediated myopathy, Statin-induced autoimmune myositis, Statin-induced necrotizing autoimmune myopathy
- Specialty: Rheumatology
- Symptoms: Muscle weakness
- Treatment: Corticosteroids, immunosuppressive medications, withdrawal of the implicated statin
- Frequency: Rare

Statin-associated autoimmune myopathy (SAAM), also known as anti-HMGCR myopathy, is a very rare form of muscle damage caused by the immune system in people who take statin medications. However, there are cases of SAAM in patients who have not taken statin medication, and this can be explained by the exposure to natural sources of statin such as red yeast rice, which is statin rich. This theory is supported by the higher prevalence of statin-naive SAAM patients in Asian cohorts, who have statin-rich diets.

The exact cause is unclear. A combination of consistent findings on physical examination, the presence of anti HMG-CoA reductase antibodies in a person with myopathy, evidence of muscle breakdown, and muscle biopsy diagnose SAAM.

Treatment involves stopping the associated statin medication and taking medication to suppress the immune system.

SAAM is estimated to occur in 2-3 people out of every 100,000 statin-treated individuals. It appears to be more common in people over the age of 50.

== Signs and symptoms ==
Severe weakness of the proximal muscles (shoulders, upper arms, thighs) on both sides of the body, very high blood levels of the enzyme creatine kinase (CK) being released by broken down skeletal muscle, and persistent symptoms and CK elevation despite stopping the offending statin medication are the hallmarks of SAAM. Other forms of statin associated muscle damage (myopathy) usually resolve after stopping the involved statin. Mild joint pain and rash may be present. In people affected by SAAM, the median duration of statin therapy was 38 months before the onset of muscular symptoms. SAAM may affect people after long-term statin use even if they had no previous muscular side effects.

A differentiating feature between this and more benign statin side effects is SAAM typically has a late onset. While muscle pain (myalgia) is seen in 9-20% of patients treated with statins, it typically occurs in the first month of treatment. SAAM has a later onset, occurring years after uncomplicated statin use. In some cases even after statins have been discontinued for several years.

== Pathogenesis ==
It is unclear precisely how statins lead to statin-associated autoimmune myopathy. The disorder is positively associated with HLA-DR11 and the DRB1*11:01 allele. There are likely other unidentified genetic and environmental risk factors associated with SAAM, given the prevalence of the DRB1 allele and the low incidence of autoimmunity in that group. Statins inhibit HMG-CoA reductase activity and consequently lower cholesterol levels in the blood. However, by doing this, they also increase the production of the HMG-CoA reductase protein. SAAM hypothetically triggers this increase in the production of HMG-CoA reductase and associated abnormal processing of this protein in genetically susceptible individuals. This abnormal processing theoretically triggers the generation of antibodies targeting the HMG-CoA reductase protein resulting in SAAM. Another theory postulates that the configuration of the HMG-CoA reductase protein may change when statin medications bind to it causing the protein to expose certain antigens that the immune system is not tolerant to resulting in the production of antibodies against it.

== Diagnosis ==
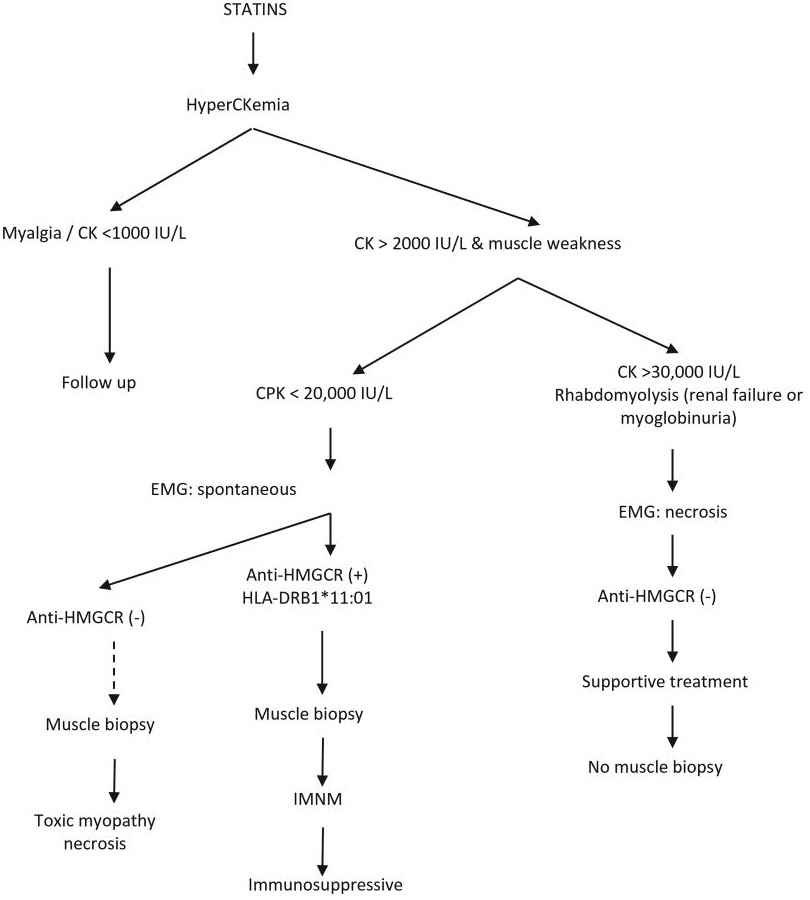
Diagnostic algorithm for statin-associated myopathy.

The development of necrotizing myopathy after statin exposure is insufficient to make the diagnosis. Testing must first exclude other causes of myositis and necrotizing myopathy. A muscle biopsy consistent with SAAM will demonstrate muscle cell death with muscle fiber regeneration and typically has few inflammatory cells. Immunohistochemistry testing may demonstrate additional pathologic features of SAAM. Such findings include the presence of endothelial cell membrane attack complex in non-necrotic muscle fibers and MHC class I expression.

Antibodies against HMG-CoA reductase occur in 94% of affected individuals. These antibodies are known to also occur in people who do not take statin medications. Conversely, these antibodies are absent in people who take statin medications but do not have myopathy. Thus, the presence of anti-HMG CoA reductase antibodies in someone who uses a statin and has myopathy strongly supports the diagnosis. CK levels increase to 10-100 times above normal (2000–20,000 IU/L) in more than 90% of cases. Electromyography (EMG) typically demonstrates a myopathic pattern of findings. Muscle swelling may be seen on MRI imaging.

== Treatment ==
SAAM is treated by stopping the offending statin medication and taking immunosuppressive medications. In rare cases, affected people spontaneously improve after just stopping the implicated statin. However, most cases mandate the use of immunosuppressive medication.

Corticosteroids are considered first-line treatment. Prednisone dosed at 1 milligram/kilogram of body weight daily is generally recommended. Corticosteroid therapy alone may be reasonable in cases of mild muscular weakness. More severe cases require the use of combined methotrexate, azathioprine, or mycophenolate with corticosteroids. Severe cases of SAAM may fail to respond to 8–12 weeks of combination therapy. Rituximab or intravenous immunoglobulin are recommended as add-on therapy in such cases. Intravenous immunoglobulin is an appropriate first-line therapy in select individuals. Suitable candidates for first-line intravenous immunoglobulin include people who have diabetes mellitus or who wish to avoid corticosteroid therapy.

== Prognosis ==
Proper treatment of SAAM often results in full recovery. Recovery can occur even with persistently elevated creatine kinase (CK) levels. Conversely, some people with SAAM do not regain full muscle strength despite the normalization of their CK levels. Longitudinal analysis of a patient cohort revealed that the majority of patients (85%) over 60 years old recovered full strength within four years, compared to less than half of patients below 52 years old, indicating that age during disease onset may be an important prognostic determinant. Once strength recovers, immunosuppressive medications should be tapered. Relapse remains possible during tapering efforts, and some people require long-term immunosuppression. An affected person is more likely to experience permanent muscle damage if they do not receive adequate treatment for a long time. Muscle weakness occurs due to the replacement of some muscle with fatty tissue.
