= Dermatomyositis =

Autoimmune disease of skin and muscle

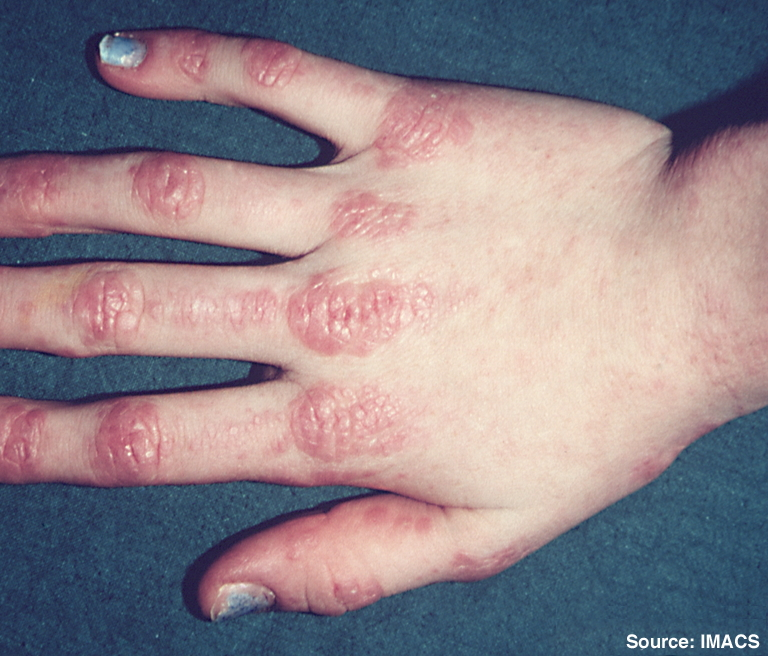
- Discrete red areas overlying the knuckles in a person with juvenile dermatomyositis. These are known as Gottron's papules.
- Specialty: Rheumatology
- Symptoms: Rash, muscle weakness, weight loss, fever
- Complications: Calcinosis, dysphagia, interstitial lung disease, heart disease (rarely), joint pain, other autoimmune conditions
- Usual onset: 40s to 50s
- Duration: Long term
- Causes: Autoimmune (Type III hypersensitivity)
- Risk factors: Other autoimmune conditions, ovarian cancer, breast cancer, lung cancer, other cancers
- Diagnostic method: Based on symptoms, blood tests, electromyography, muscle biopsies
- Differential diagnosis: Polymyositis, inclusion body myositis, scleroderma
- Treatment: Medication, physical therapy, exercise, heat therapy, orthotics, assistive devices, rest
- Medication: Corticosteroids, methotrexate, azathioprine
- Frequency: ~ 1 per 100,000 people per year

Dermatomyositis (DM) is a group of systemic autoimmune inflammatory diseases primarily affecting the skin and skeletal muscles. Its symptoms are generally a skin rash and worsening muscle weakness over time. These may occur suddenly or develop over months. Other symptoms may include weight loss, fever, lung inflammation, or light sensitivity. Complications may include calcium deposits in muscles or skin. Distinct myositis-specific autoantibodies (MSA) define clinically and pathologically distinct DM subtypes, each associated with characteristic disease manifestations, prognosis, and treatment response.

Eighty percent of adults and sixty percent of children with juvenile dermatomyositis have a MSA. These autoantibodies, produced by locally infiltrating plasma cells, can enter various cell types and disrupt the function of their target autoantigens, inducing cellular damage and inflammation that directly drive disease pathogenesis. Dermatomyositis may develop as a paraneoplastic syndrome associated with several malignancies, in which tumors harbor genetic alterations, including somatic mutations, in genes encoding the specific autoantigens targeted by the patient's corresponding autoantibodies. It is known to be associated with several viruses, especially coxsackievirus, but no definitive causal link has been found. Diagnosis is typically based on some combination of symptoms, blood tests, electromyography, and muscle biopsies.

Current treatment of dermatomyositis relies on immunosuppressive agents such as corticosteroids, methotrexate, mycophenolate mofetil, azathioprine, tacrolimus, and cyclosporine, with intravenous immunoglobulin (IVIG) widely used for refractory or severe disease. Rituximab remains an important therapeutic option despite mixed clinical trial results. Emerging targeted therapies, including Janus kinase (JAK) inhibitors and agents targeting the type I interferon pathway, such as dazukibart, have demonstrated promising efficacy. Novel approaches such as CD19 chimeric antigen receptor (CAR) T-cell therapy, plasma cell–directed therapies, and neonatal Fc receptor (FcRn) inhibitors, such as efgartigimod, are also showing encouraging results, offering the potential for sustained treatment-free disease control in the case of CD19 CAR-T cell therapy. Overall, with timely diagnosis and appropriate treatment, the prognosis of DM is generally favorable.

About one in 100,000 people receive a new diagnosis of dermatomyositis each year. The condition usually occurs in those in their 40s and 50s with women being affected more often than men. People of any age, however, may be affected. The condition was first described in the 1800s.

== Signs and symptoms ==
The main symptoms include several kinds of skin rash along with muscle weakness in both upper arms or thighs.

=== Skin ===
One form the rashes take is called "heliotrope" (a purplish color) or lilac, but may also be red. It can occur around the eyes along with swelling, but also occurs on the upper chest or back what is called the "shawl" (around the neck) or "V-sign" above the breasts and may also occur on the face, upper arms, thighs, or hands. Another form the rash takes is called Gottron's sign, which is red or violet, sometimes scaly, slightly raised papules that erupt on any of the finger joints (the metacarpophalangeal joints or the interphalangeal joints). Gottron's papules may also be found over other bony prominences including the elbows, knees, or feet. All these rashes are made worse by exposure to sunlight, and are often very itchy, painful, and may bleed.If a person exhibits only skin findings characteristic of DM, without weakness or abnormal muscle enzymes, may be classified as having amyopathic or clinically amyopathic dermatomyositis (ADM), formerly known as "dermatomyositis sine myositis".

=== Muscles ===
People with DM experience progressively worsening muscle weakness in the proximal muscles (for example, the shoulders and thighs). Tasks that use these muscles: standing from sitting, lifting, and climbing stairs, can become increasingly difficult for people with dermatomyositis.

=== Respiratory ===
The primary cause of respiratory failure in dermatomyositis is interstitial lung disease, resulting from damage to the lung interstitium. This is particularly prominent in patients with anti–MDA5 autoantibodies, who are at high risk of developing rapidly progressive interstitial lung disease. In some people, the condition affects the diaphragm muscle, the lungs directly (through inflammation), or both. This causes difficulty breathing, and dermatomyositis is considered to be a restrictive lung disease in patients with these symptoms. Respiratory symptoms occur in about 40% of people with dermatomyositis, and in these people, the symptoms may slowly progress, contributing to increased morbidity and mortality.

=== Cardiac ===
In dermatomyositis, patients can develop myocarditis and cardiac conduction system abnormalities which may be detected if the patient undergoes special testing. However, these abnormalities typically have no symptoms or clinical consequences.More rarely, these abnormalities can cause greater issues and lead to arrhythmias, heart failure, or damage to heart valves. For those dermatomyositis patients who do have cardiac symptoms caused by the disease, their clinical course may be much worse than usual.

=== Other ===
Around 30% of people have swollen, painful joints, but this is generally mild. Later in the course of the disease, patients often experience difficulty swallowing, called dysphagia, which makes it hard to move food from the mouth to the stomach. The muscles of the esophagus may become weak, leading to reduced or irregular movements that prevent proper swallowing. Additionally, individuals might suffer from gastroesophageal reflux disease (GERD), where stomach acid flows back into the esophagus, causing heartburn and irritation.

Examples of dermatomyositis

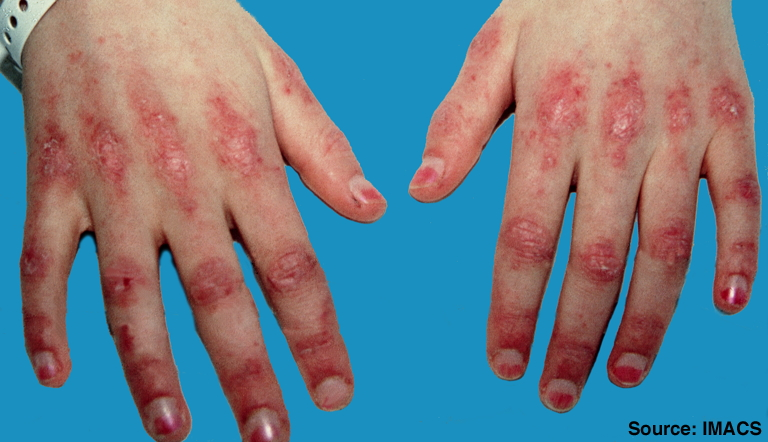
Gottron's papules on finger joints

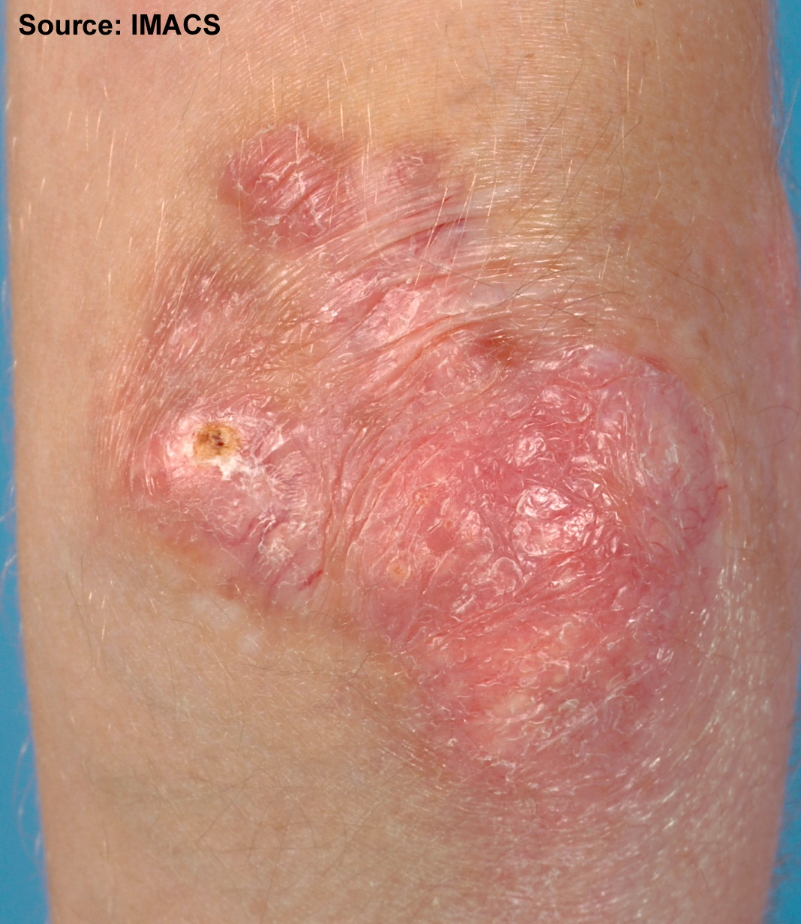
Gottron's papules on the elbows of a person with juvenile DM

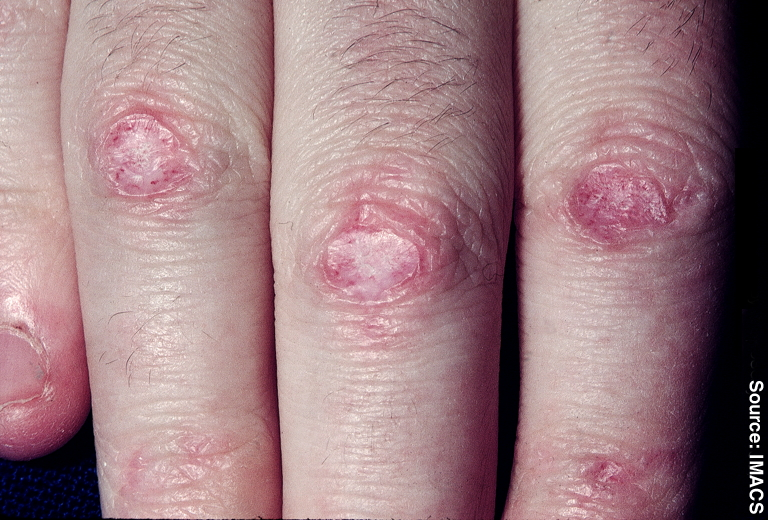
Gottron's papules

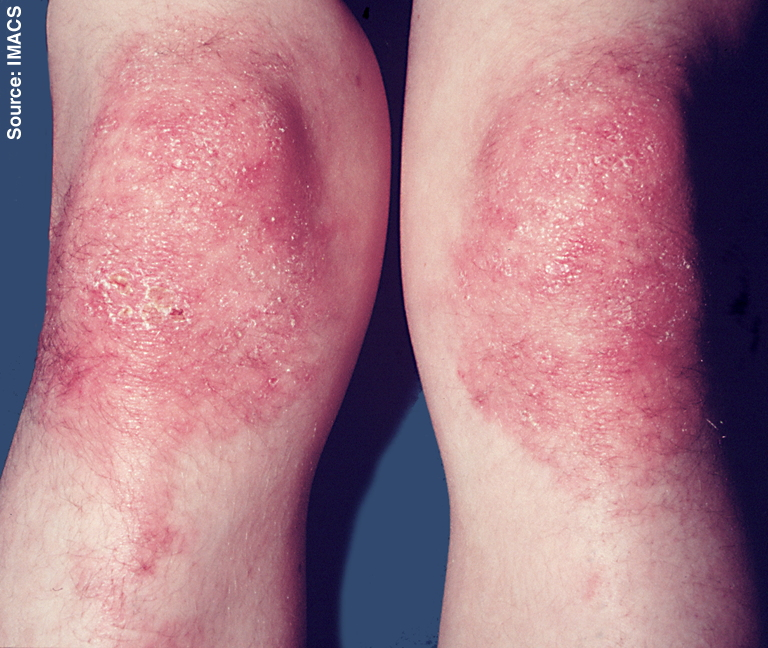
Gottron's bumps on a person with juvenile DM

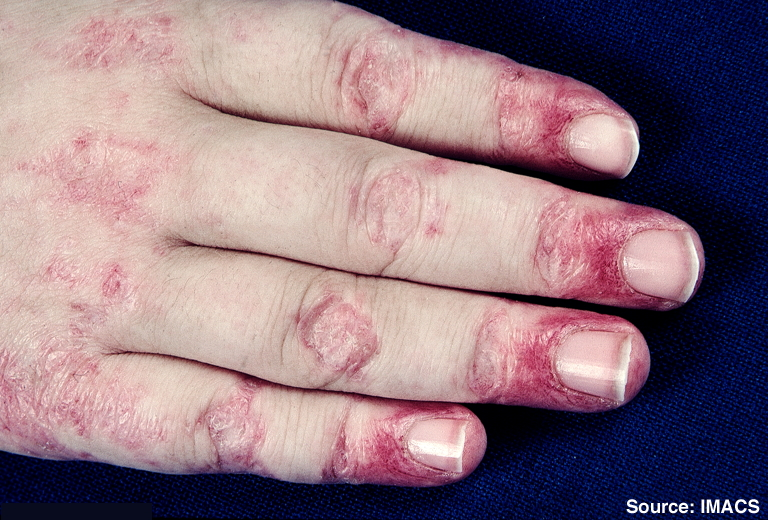
Gottron's papules in a severe case of juvenile dermatomyositis

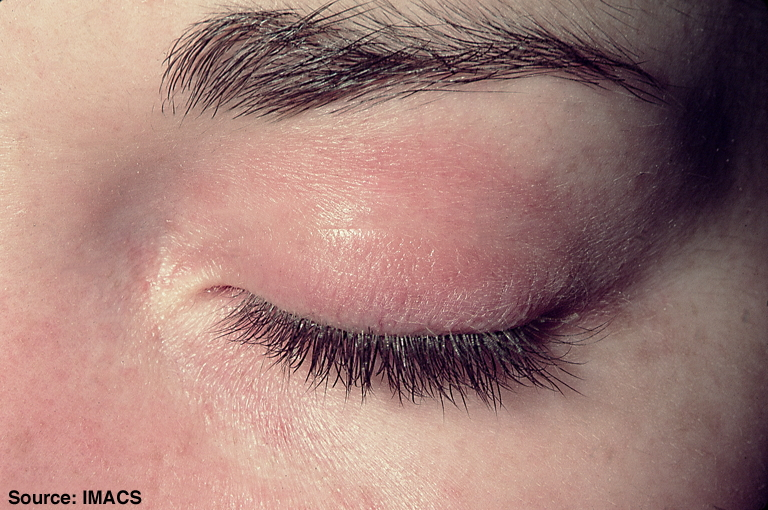
Heliotrope with swelling around the eyes

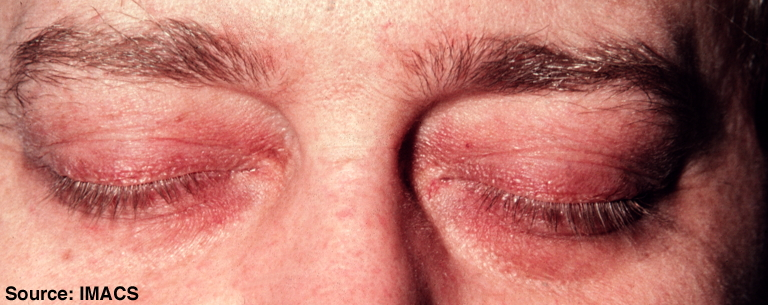
Heliotrope

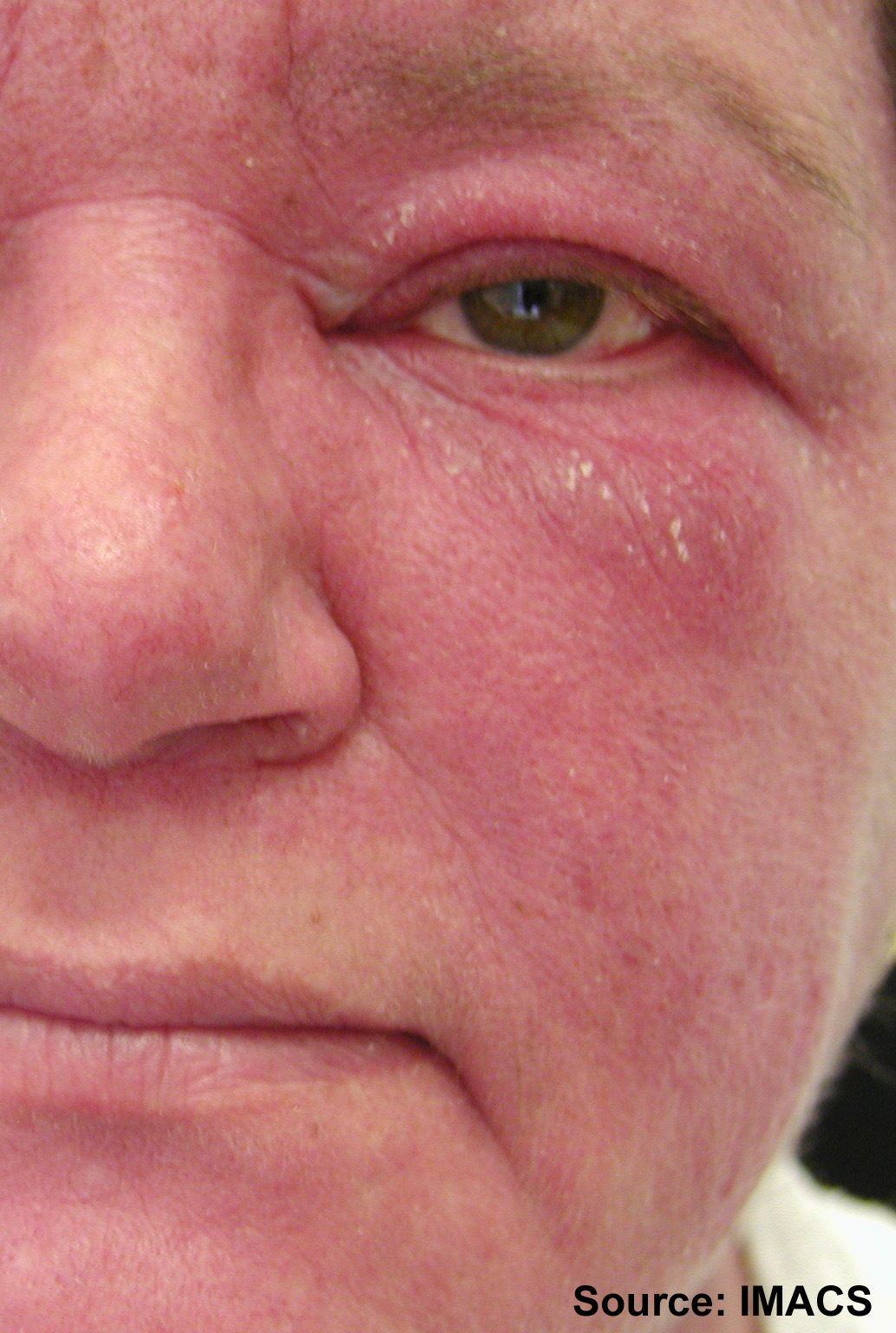
Facial rash

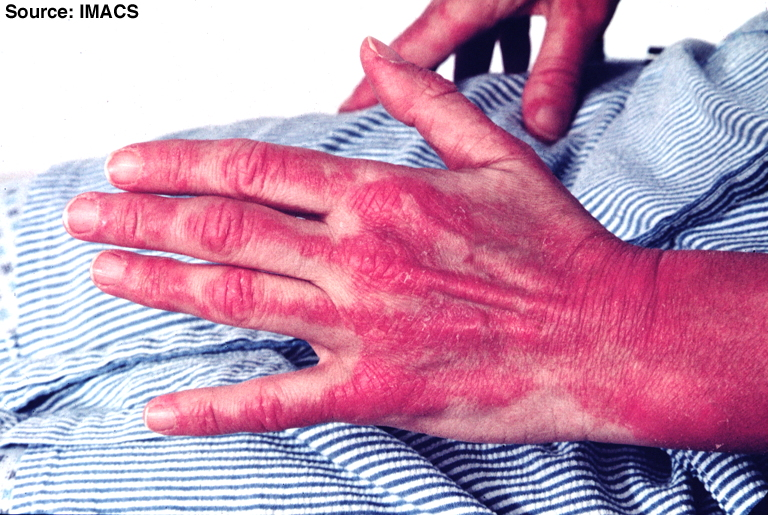
Severe rash on the hands, extending up the forearm

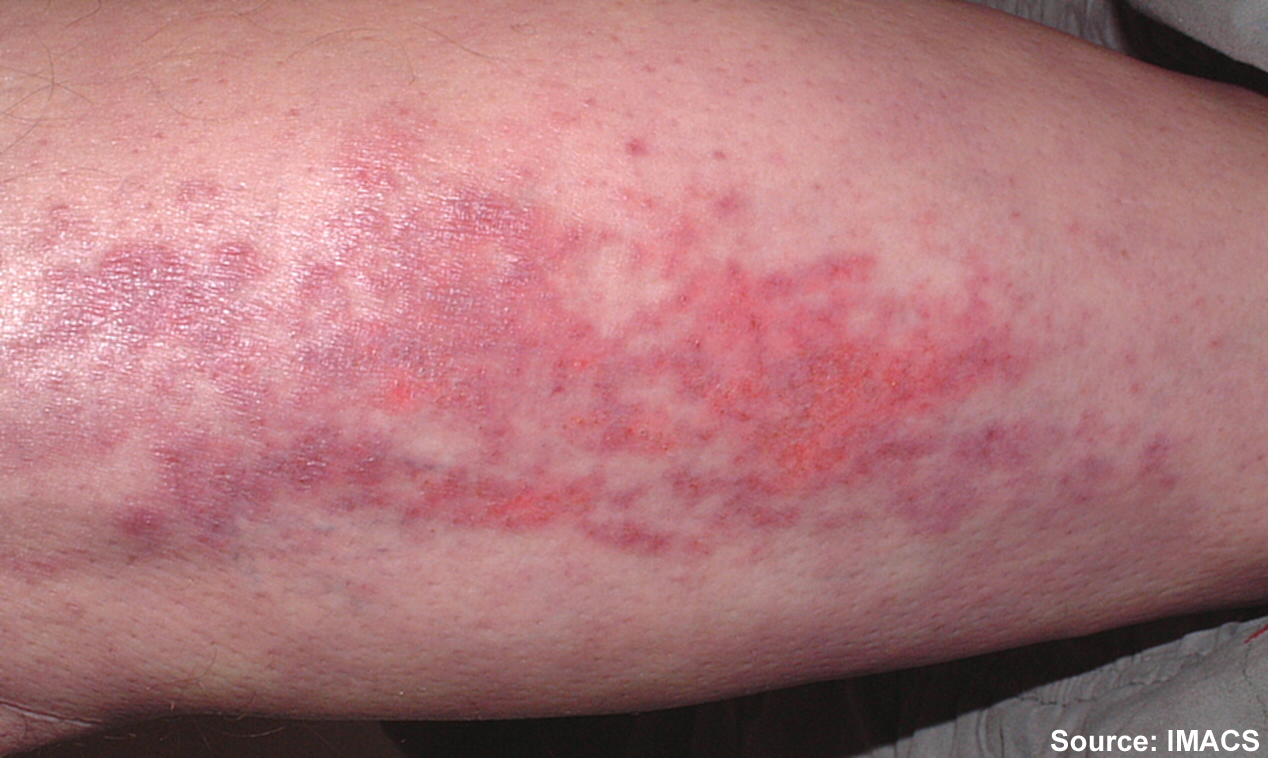
Forearm rash

== Pathogenesis ==
Recent studies suggest that the pathogenesis of DM is driven by the pathogenic internalization of autoantibodies. Although these antibodies target intracellular proteins, evidence indicates that they can enter different cell types and disrupt the function of their target autoantigens causing inflammation and damage. For example, anti-Mi-2 autoantibodies bind PHD-containing proteins, including component of the NuRD complex, inducing derepression of multiple genes, and in anti-MDA5 dermatomyositis, autoantibodies activate MDA5 directly inducing the activation of type I interferon pathways.The type I interferon pathway is especially prominent in DM and has become a major therapeutic target. Clinical responses to JAK inhibitors, anti-IFNβ therapy, and agents targeting the interferon receptor support the importance of this pathway in disease activity. Conversely, a negative trial of complement inhibition in immune-mediated necrotizing myopathy has challenged earlier models in which complement-mediated muscle injury was considered central to that subtype.

The characteristic pathological feature is perifascicular muscle involvement, often accompanied by vasculopathy. Plasma cells are found in close proximity to affected areas with high type I interferon expression and have been observed to externalize immunoglobulin heavy- and light-chain RNA into surrounding muscle cells, suggesting that this may be a potential mechanism for immunoglobulin entry into affected cell types shared across different forms of DM.

DM is paraneoplastic in up to 40% of cases, most commonly in association with underlying malignancy in patients with anti–TIF1γ autoantibodies. A majority of patients with paraneoplastic dermatomyositis harbor somatic mutations or other genetic alterations in tumor genes encoding the target autoantigens of their corresponding autoantibodies, suggesting that, in this context, autoantibody production arises secondary to an anti-tumor immune response that fails to achieve effective tumor control.The most commonly associated cancers are ovarian cancer, breast cancer, and lung cancer overall, but the most frequent associations can vary depending on patient race or ethnicity.

Inherited genetic factors confer a predisposition to developing these diseases, and HLA subtypes HLA-DR3, HLA-DR52, and HLA-DR6 seem to create a disposition to DM.

== Diagnosis and classification ==
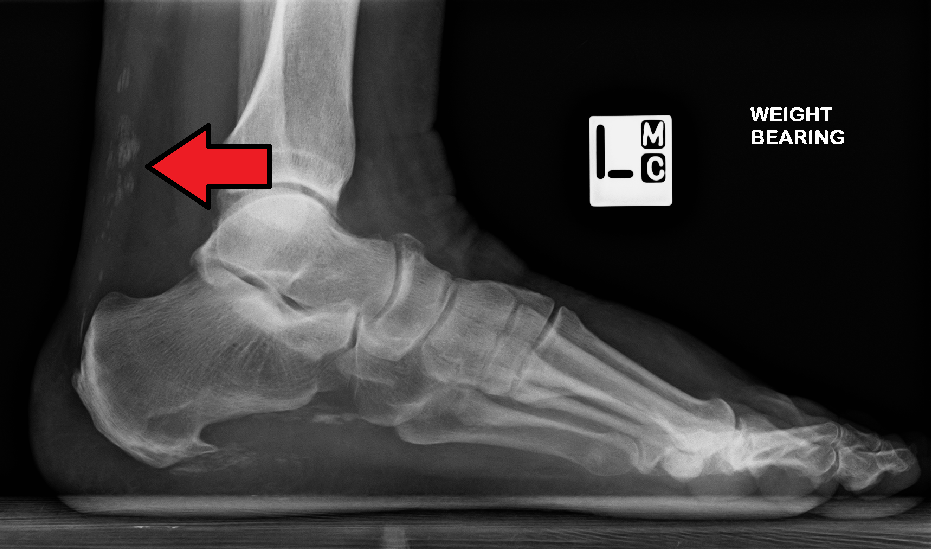
Calcinosis from dermatomyositis

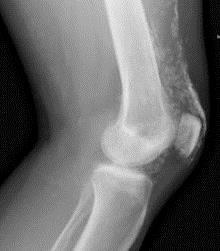
X-ray of the knee in a person with dermatomyositis with calcinosis

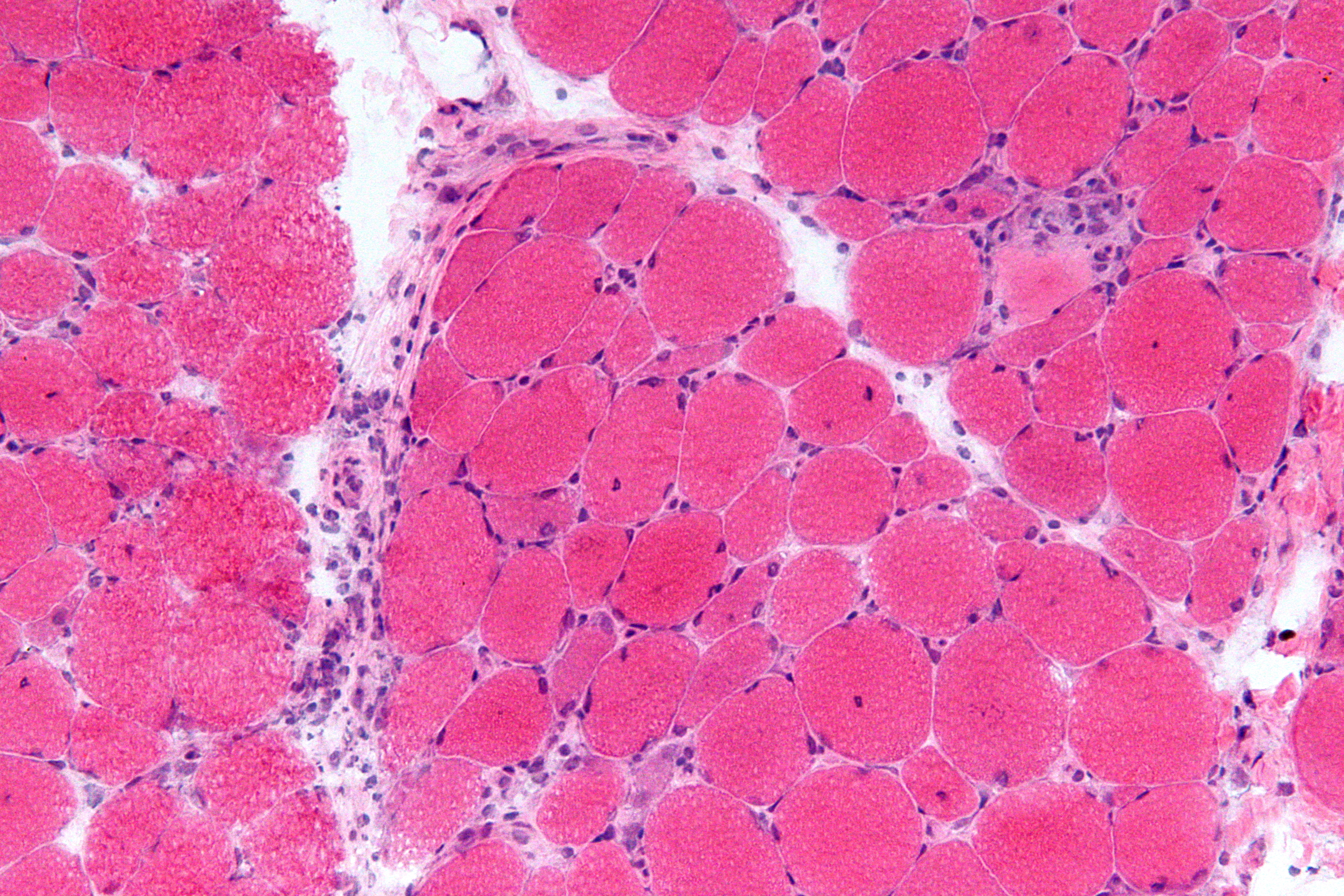
Micrograph of dermatomyositis, muscle biopsy, H&E stain

There are several diagnostic and classification criteria have been proposed for dermatomyositis. Contemporary approaches generally combine clinical features with myositis-specific and myositis-associated autoantibody testing, supported by complementary laboratory, imaging, histopathologic, and electrophysiologic investigations. Some criteria are designed to establish a broad syndromic diagnosis of DM, whereas others provide greater granularity by identifying distinct autoantibody-defined clinical subsets.

Despite these differences, the principal diagnostic features include:

1. Detection of myositis-specific autoantibodies (MSAs), including anti-Mi-2, anti-NXP2, anti-TIF1-γ, anti-MDA5, and anti-SAE. These autoantibodies are considered pathogenic and are typically mutually exclusive, with most patients harboring only a single MSA.
2. Muscle weakness in both thighs or both upper arms.
3. Using a blood test, finding higher levels of enzymes found in skeletal muscle, including creatine kinase, aldolase, and glutamate oxaloacetate, pyruvate transaminases or lactate dehydrogenase.
4. Using electromyography (testing of electric signalling in muscles), finding all three of: erratic, repetitive, high-frequency signals; short, low-energy signals between skeletal muscles and motor neurons that have multiple phases; and sharp activity when a needle is inserted into the muscle.
5. Examining a muscle biopsy under a microscope demonstrating perifascicular atrophy, increased expression of type I interferon–inducible markers (predominantly in the perifascicular regions), mononuclear white blood cells between the muscle cells, and finding abnormal muscle cell degeneration and regeneration, dying muscle cells, and muscle cells being consumed by other cells (phagocytosis).
6. Rashes typical of dermatomyositis, which include heliotrope rash, Gottron's sign, and Gottron's papules.

The fifth criterion is what differentiates dermatomyositis from other forms of inflammatory myopathy. Patients with antisynthetase autoantibodies, such as anti-Jo-1, may also present with dermatomyositis-like skin manifestations. Although these patients were historically classified as having DM, they are now generally considered to have the distinct clinical entity antisynthetase syndrome, even in the presence of characteristic cutaneous features.

Magnetic resonance imaging may be useful for guiding muscle biopsy and for distinguishing active inflammation from irreversible muscle damage as contributors to muscle weakness. In addition to muscle inflammation, MRI frequently demonstrates fascial inflammation (fasciitis) in patients with DM. X-ray may be used to investigate joint involvement and calcifications.

A case of DM may be classified as clinically amyopathic dermatomyositis (CADM) when cutaneous manifestations predominate and there is little or no clinical evidence of muscle involvement. Anti-MDA5 autoantibodies are strongly associated with CADM and are frequently accompanied by rapidly progressive interstitial lung disease. Patients with anti-TIF1-γ autoantibodies also commonly present with clinically amyopathic disease, although less frequently than those with anti-MDA5 autoantibodies.

Juvenile dermatomyositis (JDM) has traditionally been regarded as a distinct entity from adult-onset DM. However, there is no convincing evidence that the two differ fundamentally in their pathophysiology, and they are now generally considered age-specific presentations of the same group of conditions.

== Treatment ==
Multiple effective therapies are available for the treatment of DM. Standard treatment typically consists of a combination of glucocorticoids and steroid-sparing immunosuppressive agents, including methotrexate, mycophenolate mofetil, azathioprine, tacrolimus, and cyclosporine. Intravenous immunoglobulin (IVIG) has demonstrated efficacy in DM. Although rituximab did not meet its primary endpoint in randomized clinical trials, it remains an important treatment option in clinical practice, particularly for refractory disease, often in combination with IVIG.

Janus kinase (JAK) inhibitors, including tofacitinib, ruxolitinib, baricitinib, and brepocitinib, have shown efficacy in dermatomyositis. Additional strategies targeting the type I interferon pathway have also demonstrated benefit, including blockade of interferon-β with dazukibart. Brepocitinib (Lisraya) was approved for medical use in the United States in August 2026.

Deep B-cell depletion with CD19 chimeric antigen receptor (CAR) T-cell therapy has shown preliminary evidence of inducing sustained, and potentially treatment-free, remission in DM. Similarly, plasma cell–targeted therapies, including CAR T-cell approaches and monoclonal antibodies, as well as inhibitors of the neonatal Fc receptor (FcRn), such as efgartigimod, have emerged as promising therapeutic strategies for DM.

Antimalarial medications, such as hydroxychloroquine, have historically been used to manage the cutaneous manifestations of DM. However, given the potential for hypersensitivity reactions in DM, their use is generally limited to patients who have previously responded well and tolerated these therapies, rather than being routinely employed in DM.

== Prognosis ==
The cutaneous manifestations of dermatomyositis may or may not improve with therapy in parallel with the improvement of the myositis. In some people, the weakness and rash resolve together. In others, the two are not linked, with one or the other being more challenging to control. Often, cutaneous disease persists after adequate control of the muscle disease.The risk of death from the condition is much higher if the heart or lungs are affected.Before the advent of modern therapies, the prognosis was poor. However, with timely diagnosis and appropriate management, the prognosis has improved substantially, and outcomes are now generally favorable.

== Epidemiology ==
Incidence of DM peaks at ages 40–50, but the disease can affect people of all ages. It tends to affect more women than men. The prevalence of DM ranges from one to 22 per 100,000 people.

== Society and culture ==
People who were affected with dermatomyositis:

- Opera singer Maria Callas (1923–1977) allegedly had dermatomyositis from 1975 until her death.
- Actor Laurence Olivier (1907–1989) had dermatomyositis from 1974 until his death.
- American football running back Ricky Bell (1955–1984), the runner-up for the Heisman Trophy in 1976, and the number-one pick in the NFL draft in 1977, died at the age of 29 from heart failure caused by this disease.
- Rob Buckman (1948–2011) a doctor, comedian, and author, and the president of the Humanist Association of Canada.
- Samantha, Indian actress diagnosed in 2022.
- Suhani Bhatnagar (2005–2024), Indian actress.
- Tim Rooney (1947–2006), American actor and son of Mickey Rooney.
