= Muscle weakness =

Lack of muscle strength

- Other names: Myasthenia
- Specialty: Neurology

Muscle weakness is a lack of muscle strength. Its causes are numerous and can be divided into conditions associated with either true or perceived muscle weakness. True muscle weakness is a primary symptom of a variety of skeletal muscle diseases, including muscular dystrophy and inflammatory myopathy. It occurs in neuromuscular junction disorders, such as myasthenia gravis. Muscle weakness can also be caused by low levels of potassium and other electrolytes within muscle cells. It may be temporary or long-lasting, ranging from seconds or minutes to months or years. The term myasthenia is from my- from Greek μυο meaning "muscle" + -asthenia ἀσθένεια meaning "weakness".

== Types ==
Neuromuscular fatigue can be classified as either "central" or "peripheral" depending on its cause. Central muscle fatigue manifests as an overall sense of energy deprivation, while peripheral muscle fatigue manifests as a local, muscle-specific inability to do work.

=== Neuromuscular fatigue ===
Nerves control the contraction of muscles by determining the number, sequence, and force of muscular contraction. When a nerve experiences synaptic fatigue it becomes unable to stimulate the muscle that it innervates. Most movements require a force far below what a muscle could potentially generate, and barring pathology, neuromuscular fatigue is seldom an issue.

For extremely powerful contractions that are close to the upper limit of a muscle's ability to generate force, neuromuscular fatigue can become a limiting factor in untrained individuals. In novice strength trainers, the muscle's ability to generate force is most strongly limited by nerve's ability to sustain a high-frequency signal. After an extended period of maximum contraction, the nerve's signal reduces in frequency and the force generated by the contraction diminishes. There is no sensation of pain or discomfort; instead, the muscle appears to simply "stop listening." and gradually cease to move, often lengthening. As there is insufficient stress on the muscles and tendons, there will often be no delayed onset muscle soreness following the workout. Part of the process of strength training is increasing the nerve's ability to generate sustained, high frequency signals which allow a muscle to contract with their greatest force. It is this "neural training" that causes several weeks worth of rapid gains in strength, which level off once the nerve is generating maximum contractions and the muscle reaches its physiological limit. Past this point, training effects increase muscular strength through myofibrillar or sarcoplasmic hypertrophy and metabolic fatigue becomes the factor limiting contractile force.

=== Central fatigue ===
Central fatigue is a reduction in the neural drive or nerve-based motor command to working muscles that results in a decline in the force output. It has been suggested that the reduced neural drive during exercise may be a protective mechanism to prevent organ failure if the work was continued at the same intensity. There has been a great deal of interest in the role of serotonergic pathways for several years because its concentration in the brain increases with motor activity. During motor activity, serotonin released in synapses that contact motoneurons promotes muscle contraction. During high level of motor activity, the amount of serotonin released increases and a spillover occurs. Serotonin binds to extrasynaptic receptors located on the axon initial segment of motoneurons with the result that nerve impulse initiation and thereby muscle contraction are inhibited.

=== Peripheral muscle fatigue ===
Peripheral muscle fatigue during physical work is an inability for the body to supply sufficient energy or other metabolites to the contracting muscles to meet the increased energy demand. This is the most common case of physical fatigue—affecting a national average of 72% of adults in the work force in 2002. This causes contractile dysfunction that manifests in the eventual reduction or lack of ability of a single muscle or local group of muscles to do work. The insufficiency of energy, i.e. sub-optimal aerobic metabolism, generally results in the accumulation of lactic acid and other acidic anaerobic metabolic by-products in the muscle, causing the stereotypical burning sensation of local muscle fatigue, though recent studies have indicated otherwise, actually finding that lactic acid is a source of energy.

The fundamental difference between the peripheral and central theories of muscle fatigue is that the peripheral model of muscle fatigue assumes failure at one or more sites in the chain that initiates muscle contraction. Peripheral regulation therefore depends on the localized metabolic chemical conditions of the local muscle affected, whereas the central model of muscle fatigue is an integrated mechanism that works to preserve the integrity of the system by initiating muscle fatigue through muscle derecruitment, based on collective feedback from the periphery, before cellular or organ failure occurs. Therefore, the feedback that is read by this central regulator could include chemical and mechanical as well as cognitive cues. The significance of each of these factors will depend on the nature of the fatigue-inducing work that is being performed.

Though not universally used, "metabolic fatigue" is a common alternative term for peripheral muscle weakness, because of the reduction in contractile force due to the direct or indirect effects of the reduction of substrates or accumulation of metabolites within the muscle fiber. This can occur through a simple lack of energy to fuel contraction, or through interference with the ability of Ca^{2+} to stimulate actin and myosin to contract.

=== Lactic acid hypothesis ===
It was once believed that lactic acid build-up was the cause of muscle fatigue. The assumption was lactic acid had a "pickling" effect on muscles, inhibiting their ability to contract. The impact of lactic acid on performance is now uncertain, it may assist or hinder muscle fatigue.

Produced as a by-product of fermentation, lactic acid can increase intracellular acidity of muscles. This can lower the sensitivity of contractile apparatus to calcium ions (Ca^{2+}) but also has the effect of increasing cytoplasmic Ca^{2+} concentration through an inhibition of the chemical pump that actively transports calcium out of the cell. This counters inhibiting effects of potassium ions (K^{+}) on muscular action potentials. Lactic acid also has a negating effect on the chloride ions in the muscles, reducing their inhibition of contraction and leaving K^{+} as the only restricting influence on muscle contractions, though the effects of potassium are much less than if there were no lactic acid to remove the chloride ions. Ultimately, it is uncertain whether lactic acid reduces fatigue through increased intracellular calcium or increases fatigue through reduced sensitivity of contractile proteins to Ca^{2+}.

== Pathophysiology ==
Muscle cells work by detecting a flow of electrical impulses from the brain which signals them to contract through the release of calcium by the sarcoplasmic reticulum. Fatigue (reduced ability to generate force) may occur due to the nerve, or within the muscle cells themselves. New research from scientists at Columbia University suggests that muscle fatigue is caused by calcium leaking out of the muscle cell. This causes there to be less calcium available for the muscle cell. In addition an enzyme is proposed to be activated by this released calcium which eats away at muscle fibers.

Substrates within the muscle generally serve to power muscular contractions. They include molecules such as adenosine triphosphate (ATP), glycogen and creatine phosphate. ATP binds to the myosin head and causes the ‘ratchetting’ process that results in muscle contraction according to the sliding filament model. Creatine phosphate stores energy so ATP can be rapidly regenerated within the muscle cells from adenosine diphosphate (ADP) and inorganic phosphate ions, allowing for sustained powerful contractions that last between 5–7 seconds. Glycogen is the intramuscular storage form of glucose, used to generate energy quickly once intramuscular creatine stores are exhausted, producing lactic acid as a metabolic byproduct. Contrary to common belief, lactic acid accumulation does not actually cause the burning sensation we feel when we exhaust our oxygen and oxidative metabolism, but in actuality, lactic acid in presence of oxygen recycles to produce pyruvate in the liver which is known as the Cori cycle.

Substrates produce metabolic fatigue by being depleted during exercise, resulting in a lack of intracellular energy sources to fuel contractions. In essence, the muscle stops contracting because it lacks the energy to do so.

== Diagnosis ==
=== Grading ===
The severity of muscle weakness can be classified into different "grades" based on the following criteria:

- Grade 0: No contraction or muscle movement.
- Grade 1: Trace of contraction, but no movement at the joint.
- Grade 2: Movement at the joint with gravity eliminated.
- Grade 3: Movement against gravity, but not against added resistance.
- Grade 4: Movement against external resistance with less strength than usual.
- Grade 5: Normal strength.

=== Classification ===
==== Proximal and distal ====
Muscle weakness can also be classified as either "proximal" or "distal" based on the location of the muscles that it affects. Proximal muscle weakness affects muscles closest to the body's midline, while distal muscle weakness affects muscles further out on the limbs. Proximal muscle weakness can be seen in Cushing's syndrome and hyperthyroidism.

==== True and perceived ====
Muscle weakness can be classified as either "true" or "perceived" based on its cause.

- True muscle weakness (or neuromuscular weakness) describes a condition where the force exerted by the muscles is less than would be expected, for example muscular dystrophy.
- Perceived muscle weakness (or non-neuromuscular weakness) describes a condition where a person feels more effort than normal is required to exert a given amount of force but actual muscle strength is normal, for example myalgic encephalomyelitis/chronic fatigue syndrome.

In some conditions, such as myasthenia gravis, muscle strength is normal when resting, but true weakness occurs after the muscle has been subjected to exercise. This is also true for some cases of chronic fatigue syndrome, where objective post-exertion muscle weakness with delayed recovery time has been measured and is a feature of some of the published definitions.
