= GRAM domain =

Protein domain

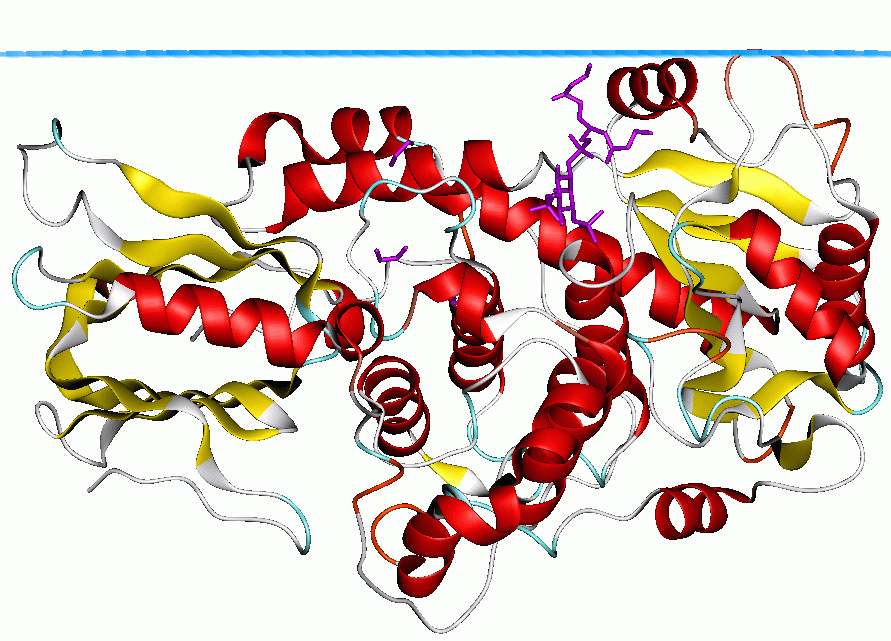
- Myotubularin-related protein 2

Identifiers
- Symbol: GRAM
- Pfam: PF02893
- Pfam clan: CL0266
- InterPro: IPR004182
- SMART: GRAM
- SCOP2: 1lw3 / SCOPe / SUPFAM
- OPM superfamily: 130
- OPM protein: 1zvr
- CDD: cd10570
- Membranome: 349
Available protein structures:
- PDB: IPR004182 PF02893 (ECOD; PDBsum)
- AlphaFold: IPR004182; PF02893

The GRAM domain is found in glucosyltransferases, myotubularins and other membrane-associated proteins. The structure of the GRAM domain is similar to that found in PH domains.

Proteins containing GRAM domains are found in all eukaryotes and bacteria, but not archaea. Various GRAM domains can bind proteins or lipids.

== Human proteins containing this domain ==
GRAMD1A; GRAMD1B; GRAMD1C; GRAMD2A; GRAMD2B; GRAMD4; MTM1; MTMR1; MTMR2; NCOA7; NSMAF; OXR1; SBF1; SBF2; TBC1D8; TBC1D8B; TBC1D9; TBC1D9B; WBP2; WBP2NL; dJ439F8.1;
