= Myotubularin =

Protein domain

Myotubularin-related
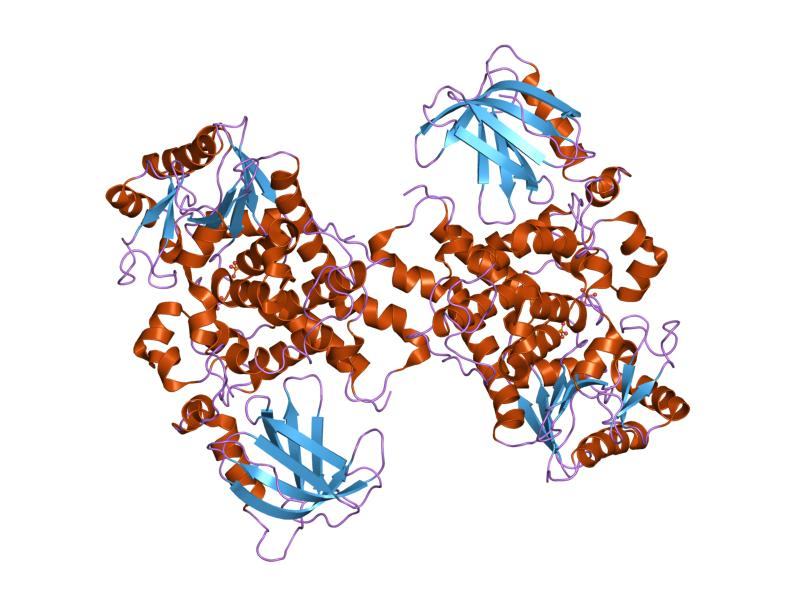
- Structure of a phosphoinositide phosphatase.

Identifiers
- Symbol: Myotub-related
- Pfam: PF06602
- InterPro: IPR010569
- SCOP2: 1m7r / SCOPe / SUPFAM
- OPM superfamily: 130
- OPM protein: 1zvr
Available protein structures:
- PDB: IPR010569 PF06602 (ECOD; PDBsum)
- AlphaFold: IPR010569; PF06602

Myotubularin domain represents a region within eukaryotic myotubularin-related proteins that is sometimes found with the GRAM domain. Myotubularin is a dual-specific lipid phosphatase that dephosphorylates phosphatidylinositol 3-phosphate and phosphatidylinositol (3,5)-bi-phosphate. Mutations in gene encoding myotubularin-related proteins have been associated with disease.

== Human proteins containing this domain ==
MTM1; MTMR1; MTMR2; MTMR3; MTMR4; MTMR6; MTMR7; MTMR8; MTMR9; MTMR10; MTMR11; MTMR12; MTMR14; SBF1; SBF2;
