= GRAM domain containing 1B =

Protein-coding gene in the species Homo sapiens

GRAMD1B

Identifiers
- Aliases: GRAMD1B, GRAM domain containing 1B, LINC01059, Aster-B
- External IDs: MGI: 1925037; GeneCards: GRAMD1B

Gene location (Human)
Chr.	Chromosome 11 (human)
Band	11q24.1	Start	123,358,428 bp
Band	11q24.1	End	123,627,774 bp

Gene location (Mouse)
Chr.	Chromosome 9 (mouse)
Band	9|9 A5.1	Start	40,293,233 bp
Band	9|9 A5.1	End	40,531,383 bp
RNA expression pattern
Bgee	Human / Mouse (ortholog); Top expressed in: left adrenal gland; right adrenal gland; paraflocculus of cerebellum; right adrenal cortex; left adrenal cortex; trigeminal ganglion; right hemisphere of cerebellum; lateral nuclear group of thalamus; spinal ganglia; parietal lobe / Top expressed in: neural layer of retina; cerebellar cortex; yolk sac; decidua; adrenal medulla; visual cortex; superior frontal gyrus; primary visual cortex; dentate gyrus of hippocampal formation granule cell; lobe of cerebellum; More reference expression data
BioGPS	n/a
Gene ontology
Molecular function	phosphatidylserine binding; lipid binding; cholesterol binding; phosphatidic acid binding; cholesterol transfer activity
Cellular component	membrane; integral component of membrane; endoplasmic reticulum; endoplasmic reticulum membrane; plasma membrane; endoplasmic reticulum-plasma membrane contact site
Biological process	lipid transport; cholesterol transport; cholesterol homeostasis; cellular response to cholesterol; intermembrane sterol transfer
Sources:Amigo / QuickGO
Orthologs
Databases	NCBI: entry; OMA: entry
Species	Human	Mouse
Entrez	57476	235283
Ensembl	ENSG00000023171	ENSMUSG00000040111
UniProt	Q3KR37	Q80TI0
RefSeq (mRNA)	NM_001286563; NM_001286564; NM_020716; NM_001330396	NM_172768; NM_001357617; NM_001357618; NM_001357619; NM_001357620 NM_001357621; NM_001357622; NM_001357623
RefSeq (protein)	NP_001273492; NP_001273493; NP_001317325; NP_065767; NP_001341766 NP_001354347; NP_001354348; NP_001354349; NP_001354350	NP_766356; NP_001344546; NP_001344547; NP_001344548; NP_001344549 NP_001344550; NP_001344551; NP_001344552
Location (UCSC)	Chr 11: 123.36 – 123.63 Mb	Chr 9: 40.29 – 40.53 Mb
PubMed search
- Wikidata
View/Edit Human	View/Edit Mouse

GRAM domain containing 1B, also known as GRAMD1B, Aster-B and KIAA1201, is a cholesterol transport protein that is encoded by the GRAMD1B gene. It contains a transmembrane region and two domains of known function; the GRAM domain and a VASt domain. It is anchored to the endoplasmic reticulum. This highly conserved gene is found in a variety of vertebrates and invertebrates. Homologs (Lam/Ltc proteins) are found in yeast.

== Gene ==
GRAMD1B, also known as KIAA1201, is located in the human genome at 11q24.1. It is located on the + strand and is flanked by a variety of other genes. It spans 269,347 bases.

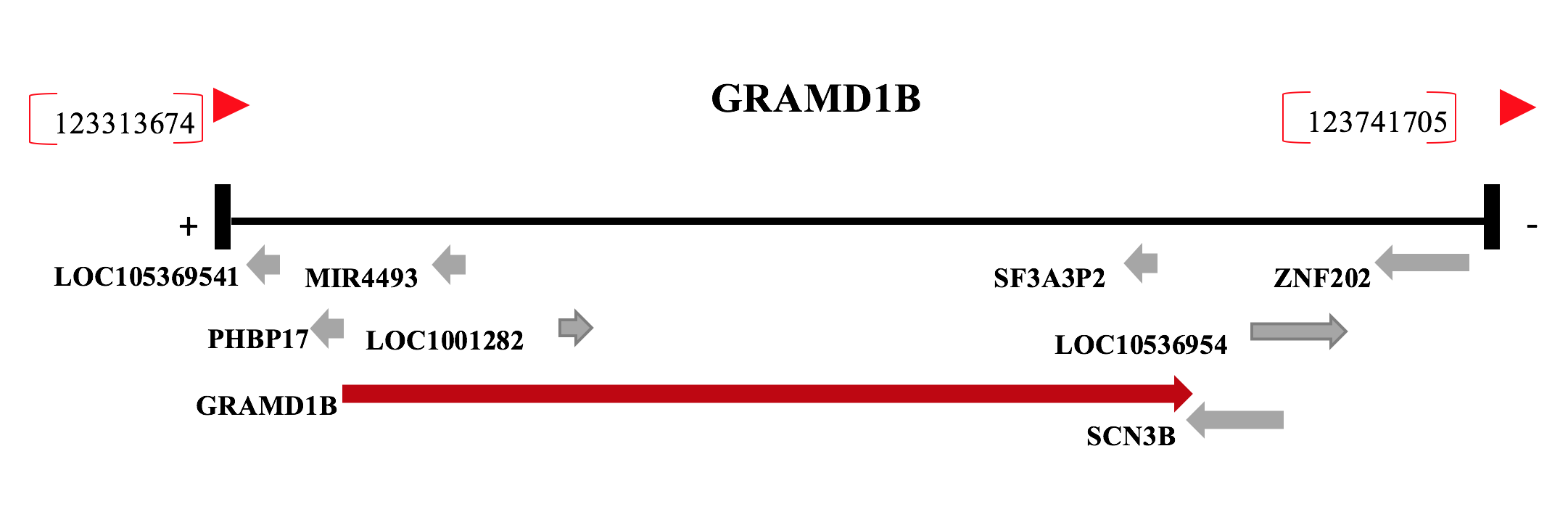
GRAMD1B and surrounding genes

== mRNA ==
The most verified isoform, isoform 1, contains 21 exons. There are four validated isoform variants of human GRAMD1B. These consist of truncated 5’ and 3’ regions, resulting in the loss of an exon. One prominent analysis of the mouse gene predicts one form of Gramd1b that is 699 amino acids long.

Isoform	mRNA length (bp)	Exons	Protein length (aa)	Status
1	7927	21	745	Validated
2	7906	20	738	Validated
3	7636	20	698	Validated
4	7561	20	694	Validated

== Protein ==
GRAMD1B is an integral membrane protein that contains several domains, motifs and signals.

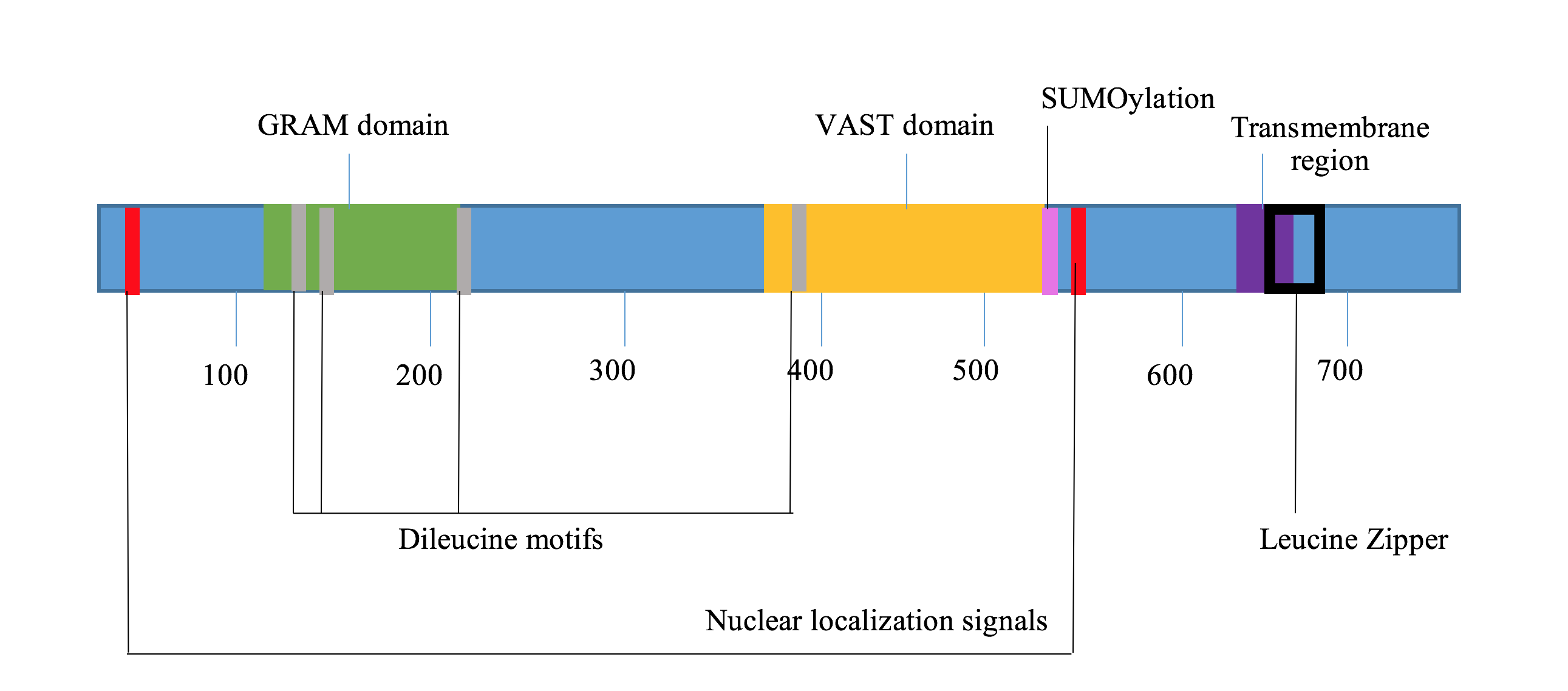
GRAMD1B protein structure

=== Domains ===
There are two confirmed cytoplasmic domains within GRAMD1B. The protein gets its name from the GRAM domain, located approximately 100 amino acids from the start codon. The GRAM domain is commonly found in myotubularin family phosphatases and predominantly involved in membrane coupled processes. GRAMD1B also contains the VASt (VAD1 Analog of StAR-related lipid transfer) domain. The VASt domain is predominantly associated with lipid binding domains, such as GRAM. It is most likely to function in binding large hydrophobic ligands and may be specific for sterol. A C-terminal domain in GRAMD1B sits within the lumen of the ER, is predicted to have alpha-helical secondary structure, and is modified by tryptophan C-mannosyaltion.

=== Composition Features ===
There are two negative charge clusters, located from amino acids 232-267 and 348-377. The first cluster is not highly conserved, nor is it located in a motif or domain. The second cluster is located directly before the VASt domain and is conserved.

There are three repeat sequence regions, all fairly conserved in orthologs.

Repeat #	Sets of Repeats	Length (aa)	Location	Similarity Score
1	3	18	Within first 100 amino acids	83.44
2	2	21	GRAM domain	77.22
3	2	22	VASt domain	67.94

Molecular weight and isoelectric point are conserved in orthologs.

Region	Amino Acids	Isoelectric point	Molecular Weight (kdal)
Human GRAMD1B	745	pH of 6.02	86.5
GRAM domain	94	pH of 8.27	11.3
VASt domain	144	pH of 9.41	17.3
Transmembrane region	21	pH of 5.18	2.3

=== Structure ===
The protein contains four dileucine motifs, three located within or close to the GRAM domain. A predicted leucine zipper pattern extends through a majority the transmembrane region though it is not a nuclear protein. A SUMOylation site is located directly after the VASt domain. The proteins secondary structure consists of alpha-helices, beta-strands and coils. Beta-strands are mainly located within the two domains, while the alpha-helixes are concentrated near the transmembrane region. Three disulfide bonds are predicted throughout the protein.

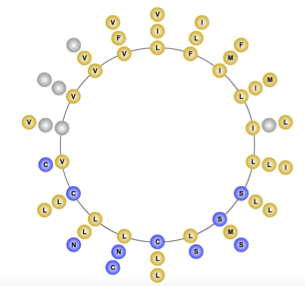
Predicted alpha-helix structure of GRAMD1B transmembrane region.

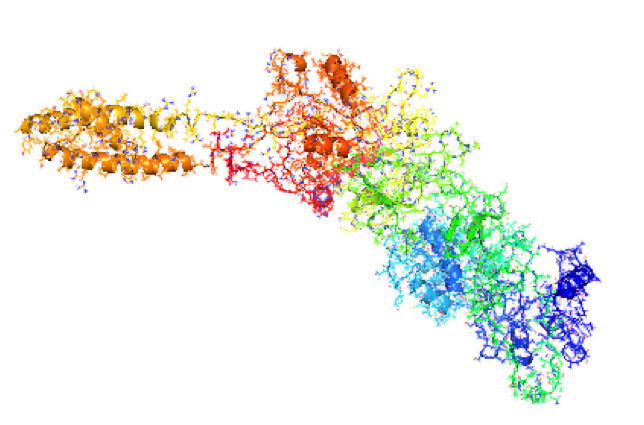
Predicted 3D structure of GRAMD1B,

=== Subcellular location ===
GRAMD1B is anchored to in the endoplasmic reticulum by a transmembrane domain.

== Expression ==
GRAMD1B is expressed in a variety of tissues. It is most highly expressed in the gonadal tissue, adrenal gland, brain and placenta. It has raised expression rates in adrenal tumors, lung tumors. Developmentally, it is most highly expressed during infancy. The EST profile is supported with experimental data from multiple sources

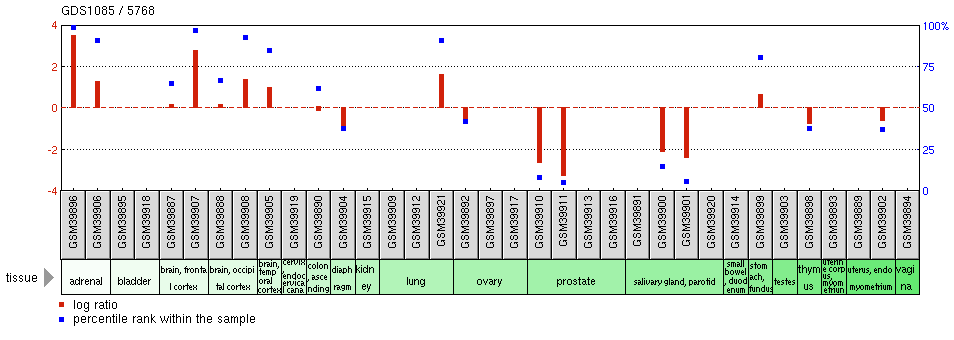
GRAMD1B expression in a variety of tissues.

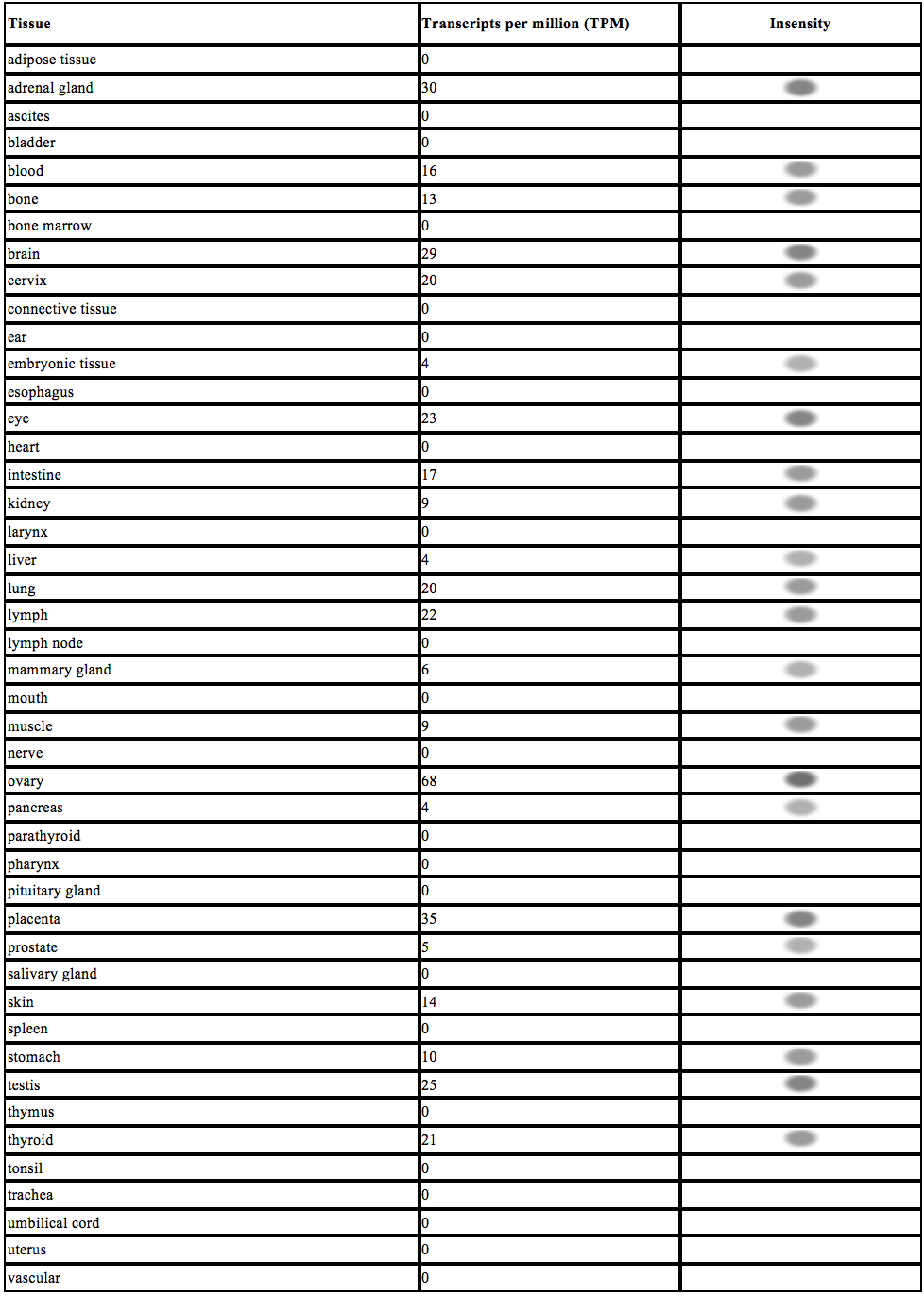
Tissue expression of GRAMD1B

== Homology ==
=== Orthologs ===
The ortholog space for GRAMD1B spans a large portion of evolutionary time. GRAMD1B can be found in mammals, bird, fish and invertebrates. Homologous proteins (Lam/Ltc) are found in yeast.

Genus species	Common name	Accession number	Date of Divergence (MYA)	Identity
Homo sapiens	Human	NP_001273492.1	0	100.00%
Aotus nancymaae	Nancy Ma's Night Monkey	XP_012325676.1	3.2	99.00%
Papio anubis	Olive Baboon	XP_017804515.1	29.44	97.00%
Castor canadensis	Beaver	XP_020037170.1	90	98.00%
Octodon degus	Dengu	XP_004636450.1	90	97.00%
Pantholops hodgsonii	Tibetan Antelope	XP_005958036.1	96	99.00%
Bos mutus	Domestic Yak	XP_005896826.1	96	98.00%
Tursiops truncatus	Dolphin	XP_019797543	96	83.00%
Elephantulus edwardii	Cape Elephant Shrew	XP_006895663.1	105	98.00%
Gallus gallus	Chicken	XP_015153638.1	312	93.00%
Calypte anna	Anna's Humming Bird	XP_008490701.1	312	91.00%
Pygoscelis adeliae	Adelie Penguin	XP_009331694.1	312	91.00%
Coturnix japonica	Japanese Quail	XP_015739426.1	312	90.00%
Anolis carolinensis	Carolina Anole	XP_008111963.1	312	87.00%
Danio rerio	Zebra Fish	XP_009303888.1	435	73.00%
Callorhinchus milii	Australian Ghost Shark	XP_007894251.1	473	77.00%
Branchiostoma belcheri	Lancelet	XP_019624725.1	684	40.00%
Octopus bimaculoides	California Two-Spot Octopus	XP_014769036.1	797	40.00%
Lingula anatina	Brachiopod	XP_013415578	797	38.00%
Zootermopsis nevadensis	Termite	KDR17240.1	797	37.00%
Trachymyrmex cornetzi	Ant	XP_018362289.1	797	34.00%

=== Paralogs ===
There are four paralogs of GRAMD1B. The most closely related is GRAMD1A while the most distant ortholog is GRAMD2A/GRAMD2.

Paralog	Sequence length	Sequence identity	Date of Divergence (MYA)
GRAMD1A	724 aa	46.60%	421.0
GRAMD1C	662 aa	37.90%	934.7
GRAMD2B/GRAMD3	491 aa	18.50%	1625.6
GRAMD2A	353 aa	16.70%	1724.2

=== Phylogeny ===
GRAMD2 diverged earliest in history while the most recent split is GRAMD1A. The GRAMD1B gene’s rate of divergence significantly faster than Fibrinogen but is not as high as Cytochrome C.

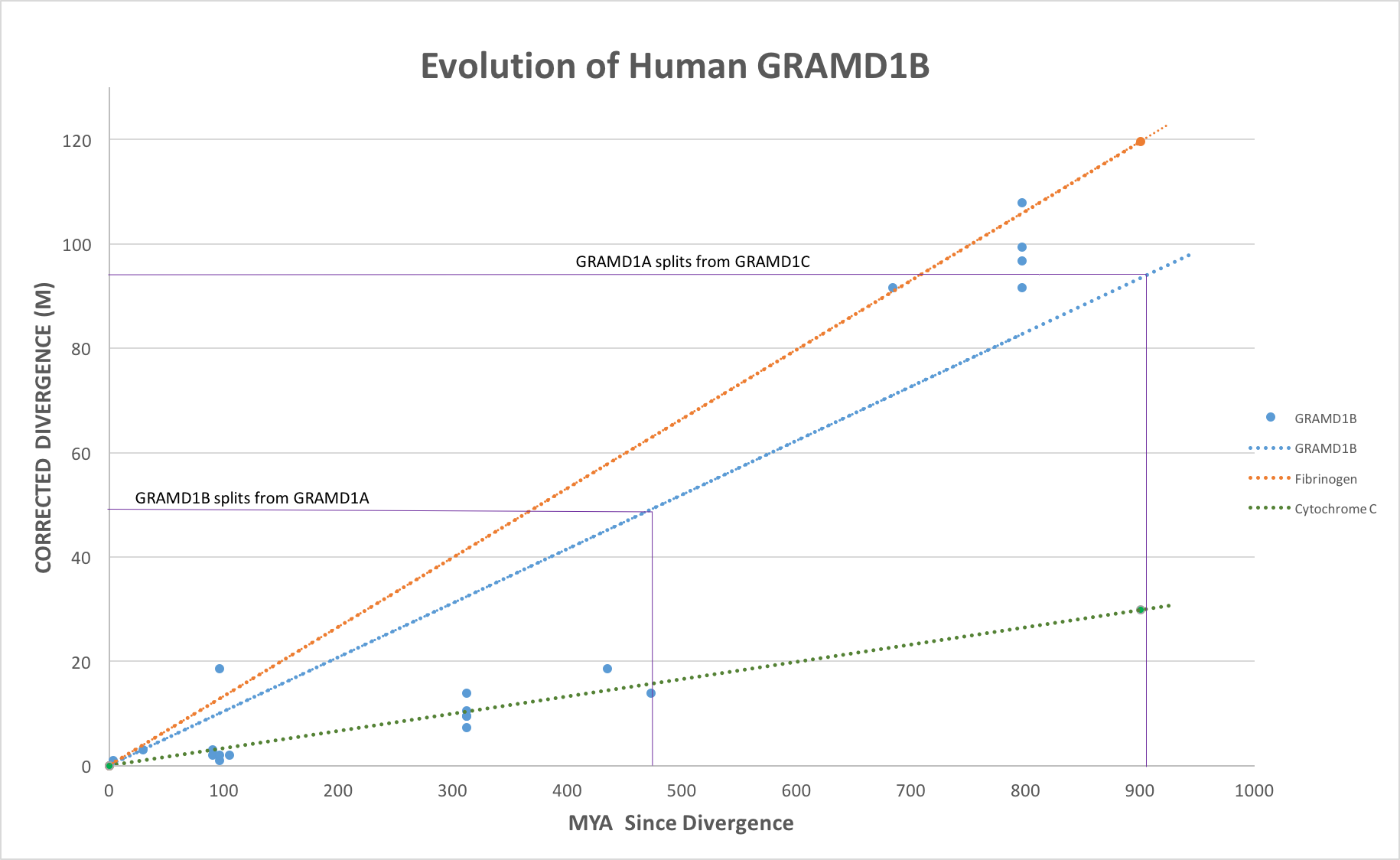
Phylogeny of GRAMD1B

== Function ==
When the plasma membrane contains high levels of cholesterol, GRAMD1b as well as GRAMD1a and GRAMD1c move to sites of contact between the plasma membrane and the endoplasmic reticulum. GRAMD1 proteins then facilitate the transport of cholesterol into the endoplasmic reticulum. In the case of GRAMD1b, the plasma membrane source of cholesterol is high-density lipoprotein (HDL). The VASt domain is responsible for binding cholesterol while the GRAM domain determines the location of the protein through sensing of cholesterol and binding partially negatively charged lipids in the plasma membrane, especially phosphatidylserine.

GRAMD1b is also implicated in transporting carotenoids within the cell.

=== Protein interactions ===
Several different proteins have been experimentally confirmed or predicted to interact with GRAMD1B.

Protein	Interaction identified via	Function	Location
COPA	Experimental	Binds dilysine motifs. Required for budding from the Golgi and retrograde Golgi to ER transport	systolic
SPICE1	Data Mining	Spindle and centriole associated. Regulates centriole duplication, proper bipolar spindle formation and chromosome congregation in mitosis	nuclear
GTPBP8	Data Mining	GTP binding protein	unconfirmed
Ywhae	Co-sedimentation	Adapter protein associated with regulating nuclear transport to the cytoplasm	nuclear

== Clinical significance ==
Mutations and other genetic studies link GRAMD1B to neurodevelopmental disorders, such as intellectual disability and schizophrenia. Loss of GRAMD1b results in reduced cholesterol storage in the adrenal gland and serum corticosterone levels in mice. Reduction of GRAMD1B and GRAMD1C suppresses the onset of a form of non-alcoholic fatty liver disease, non-alcoholic steatohepatitis (NASH) in mice.

A study tagging SNPs from chronic lymphocytic leukemia found GRAMD1B to be the second strongest risk allele region. This association is supported through a number of studies The aberrant tri-methylation of histone H3 lysine 27 induces inflammation and has been shown to increase GRAMD1B levels in colon tumors.
