= Centronuclear myopathy =

Muscular disease caused by misplaced cell nuclei

- Other names: CNM
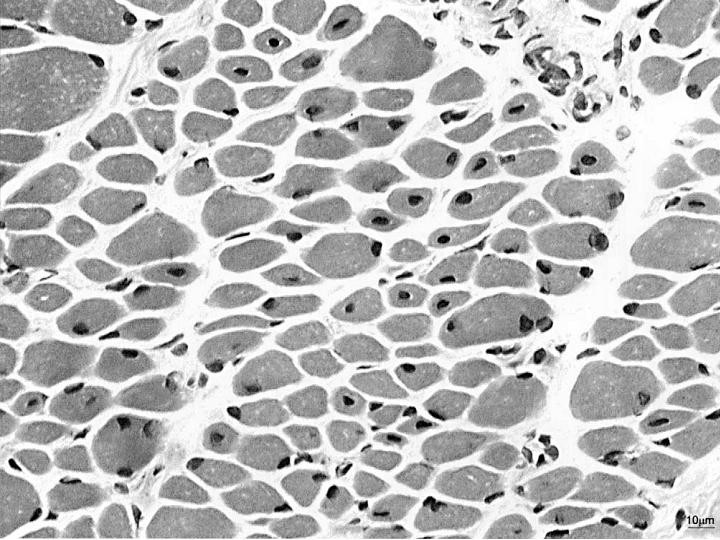
- Muscle biopsy from the quadriceps taken at 3 months of age from a girl with X-linked centronuclear ("myotubular") myopathy due to a mutation in the myotubularin (MTM1) gene and extremely skewed X-inactivation (H&E stain, transverse section). Note marked variability in fibre size, moderate increase in connective tissue and numerous central nuclei.
- Specialty: Neurology

Centronuclear myopathies (CNM) are a group of congenital myopathies where cell nuclei are abnormally located in the center of muscle cells instead of their normal location at the periphery.

Symptoms of CNM include severe hypotonia, hypoxia-requiring breathing assistance, and scaphocephaly. Among centronuclear myopathies, the X-linked myotubular myopathy form typically presents at birth, and is thus considered a congenital myopathy. However, some centronuclear myopathies may present later in life.

== Presentation ==
As with other myopathies, the clinical manifestations of MTM/CNM are most notably muscle weakness and associated disabilities. Congenital forms often present with neonatal low muscle tone, severe weakness, delayed developmental milestones (particularly gross motor milestones such as head control, crawling, and walking) and pulmonary complications (presumably due to weakness of the muscles responsible for respiration). Involvement of the facial muscles may cause ophthalmoplegia or ptosis. A mutation in the RYR1 gene causing CNM may also cause susceptibility to malignant hyperthermia, a potentially life-threatening reaction to anesthesia. While some patients with centronuclear myopathies remain ambulatory throughout their adult life, others may never crawl or walk and may require wheelchair use for mobility. There is substantial variability in the degree of functional impairment among the various centronuclear myopathies. Although this condition only affects the voluntary muscles, several children have had cardiac arrest, possibly due to the additional stress placed on the heart.

X-linked myotubular myopathy was historically a fatal condition of infancy, with life expectancy of usually less than two years. There appears to be substantial variability in the clinical severity for different genetic abnormalities at that same MTM1 gene. Further, published cases show significant differences in clinical severity among relatives with the same genetic abnormality at the MTM1 gene. Most truncating mutations of MTM1 cause a severe and early lethal phenotype, while some missense mutations are associated with milder forms and prolonged survival (up to 54 years).

Centronuclear myopathies typically have a milder presentation and a better prognosis. Autosomal dominant CNM tends to have a less severe phenotype than the autosomal recessive version. Recently, researchers discovered mutations at the gene dynamin 2 (DNM2 on chromosome 19, at site 19p13.2), responsible for the autosomal dominant form of centronuclear myopathy. This condition is now known as dynamin 2 centronuclear myopathy (abbreviated DNM2-CNM). Research has indicated that patients with DNM2-CNM have a slowly progressive muscular weakness usually beginning in adolescence or early adulthood, with an age range of 12 to 74 years.

== Genetic ==
The genetic abnormality associated with the X-linked form of myotubular myopathy (XLMTM) was first localized in 1990 to the X chromosome at site Xq28. MTM1 codes for the myotubularin protein, a highly conserved lipid phosphatase involved in cellular transport, trafficking and signalling. Approximately 80% of males with myotubular myopathy diagnosed by muscle biopsy have mutations in MTM1, and about 7% of these mutations are genetic deletions.

Centronuclear myopathies where the genetic abnormality is not sex-linked (e.g., not located on the X chromosome) are considered autosomal. Autosomal abnormalities can either be dominant or recessive, and are often referred to as AD for "autosomal dominant" or AR for "autosomal recessive").

The possible combinations of inheritance of myotubular myopathy are as follows:

Inheritance	OMIM	Gene(s)	Description
X-linked recessive	310400	MTM1 (X-linked myotubular myopathy)	The X-linked form of MTM/CNM is the most commonly diagnosed type. Almost all cases of X-linked MTM occurs in males.
Autosomal recessive	255200	BIN1, RYR1, TTN	A "recessive" abnormality will only cause disease if both copies of the gene are abnormal.
Autosomal dominant	160150	DNM2 (MYF6 and MTMR14 less common)	A "dominant" abnormality will exert its abnormal influence (e.g., causing a disease or medical condition) regardless of whether the other copy of the gene is normal or not. Within centronuclear myopathies, researchers have identified an autosomal dominant form at a gene called dynamin 2 (DNM2) on chromosome 19, and this particular condition is now referred to as dynamin 2 centronuclear myopathy (DNM2-CNM).

== Diagnosis ==
Centronuclear myopathy is diagnosed when typical histological findings on muscle biopsy are combined with suggestive clinical symptoms; muscle MR imaging may supplement clinical assessment and inform genetic testing in cases with equivocal signs.

Centronuclear myopathy manifests on muscle biopsy as centrally located nuclei encircled by a perinuclear halo filled with aggregates of glycogen and mitochondria but without myofilaments. All muscles, including extra-ocular muscles, have the distinctive central nucleus, which can affect up to 90% of the fibers.

== Treatment ==
Currently, there is no curative treatment for CNM in any form, and the multidisciplinary approach to management is primarily supportive.

== Epidemiology ==
The overall incidence of myotubular myopathy is 1 in 50,000 male live births. The incidence of other centronuclear myopathies is extremely rare, with there only being nineteen families identified with CNM throughout the world. The symptoms currently range from the majority who only need to walk with aids, from a stick to a walking frame, to total dependence on physical mobility aids such as wheelchairs and stand aids, but this latter variety is so rare that only two cases are known to the CNM "community". Approximately 80% of males with a diagnosis of myotubular myopathy by muscle biopsy will have a mutation in MTM1 identifiable by genetic sequence analysis.

== History ==
In 1966, Dr. Spiro (a New York City neurologist) published a medical report of a boy with myopathy, which upon muscle biopsy, showed that the nuclei of the muscle cells were located in the center of the muscle cells, instead of their normal location of the periphery.

More than three decades later, it is not fully understood whether this theory regarding halted (or delayed) embryonic muscle development is correct. Some research suggests that this theory may be acceptable for infant-onset myotubular myopathy (mutations at the MTM1 gene on the X chromosome) but may not be acceptable for the autosomal forms of centronuclear myopathy, while other research suggests that the growth arrest mechanism may be responsible for all forms of MTM and CNM. Regardless of whether the myopathy is caused by arrest at the "myotubular" stage, for historical reasons the name myotubular myopathy persists and is widely accepted.

== Terminology ==
Although all forms of centronuclear myopathy are considered rare, the most commonly known form of CNM is Myotubular Myopathy (MTM). (The terms "centronuclear myopathy" and "myotubular myopathy" are sometimes equated.)
