= VAD1 analog of StAR-related lipid transfer =

VASt domain

Identifiers
- Symbol: VASt domain
- Pfam: PF16016
- InterPro: IPR031968
Available protein structures:
- PDB: IPR031968 PF16016 (ECOD; PDBsum)
- AlphaFold: IPR031968; PF16016

VAD1 analog of StAR-related lipid transfer (VASt) is a steroidogenic acute regulatory protein‐related lipid transfer (StART)-like lipid-binding domain first identified in the vad1 (vascular associated death1) protein in Arabidopsis thaliana (mouse-ear cress ). Proteins containing these domains are found in eukaryotes and usually contain another lipid-binding domain, typically the GRAM domain and sometimes the C2 domain in plants and the integral peroxisomal membrane peroxin Pex24p domain in oomycetes.

== Structure ==
The VASt domain structurally resembles a truncated form of a START domain, but with limited sequence similarity. While VASt is a member of the Bet v1-like superfamily, it is unclear if it evolved from the same ancestral domain as the START domain or is an example of convergent evolution.

The domain is highly conserved across all eukaryotes and is typically present in only one copy in VASt domain-containing proteins. Like the START domain, the VASt domain consists of a helix-grip fold structure. The pocket formed is large enough to bind one lipid such as cholesterol, 25-hydroxycholesterol or ergosterol.

Analysis of the crystal structure of unbound and bound forms of VASt domains in lipid transfer proteins anchored at a membrane contact site (LAMs) from yeast revealed that the domain contains an accessible hydrophobic cavity." Upon sterol binding of the cavity, the entry point is closed or partially closed to the outside.

== Human proteins containing the VASt domain ==
The sole proteins containing this domain identified in human are GRAMD1A/Aster-A, GRAMD1B/Aster-B and GRAMD1C/Aster-C (with the VASt domain referred to as an Aster domain). These sterol transfer proteins together with GRAMD2A and GRAMD2B are LAM family proteins, although the latter two lack the VASt domain. Like LAM proteins, GRAMD1 proteins preferentially transfer sterols.
