= MTMR14 =

Protein-coding gene in the species Homo sapiens

Identifiers
- Aliases: MTMR14, C3orf29, myotubularin related protein 14
- External IDs: OMIM: 611089; MGI: 1916075; GeneCards: MTMR14
Enzyme activity
EC #	BRENDA	ExPASy	KEGG	MetaCyc
3.1.3.95	↗	↗	↗	↗

Gene location (Human)
Chr.	Chromosome 3 (human)
Band	3p25.3	Start	9,649,433 bp
Band	3p25.3	End	9,702,393 bp

Gene location (Mouse)
Chr.	Chromosome 6 (mouse)
Band	6|6 E3	Start	113,214,804 bp
Band	6|6 E3	End	113,258,353 bp
RNA expression pattern
Bgee	Human / Mouse (ortholog); Top expressed in: monocyte; granulocyte; apex of heart; blood; gastrocnemius muscle; right auricle of heart; muscle of thigh; bone marrow cell; left ventricle; spleen / Top expressed in: zygote; primary oocyte; secondary oocyte; spermatid; granulocyte; spermatocyte; epiblast; tail of embryo; Gonadal ridge; genital tubercle; More reference expression data
BioGPS	n/a
Gene ontology
Molecular function	protein tyrosine phosphatase activity; protein binding; hydrolase activity; phosphatidylinositol-3-phosphatase activity; protein serine/threonine phosphatase activity; phosphatidylinositol-3,5-bisphosphate 3-phosphatase activity
Cellular component	ruffle; perinuclear region of cytoplasm; cytoplasm; cytosol
Biological process	phosphatidylinositol biosynthetic process; peptidyl-tyrosine dephosphorylation; macroautophagy; dephosphorylation; protein dephosphorylation
Sources:Amigo / QuickGO
Orthologs
Databases	NCBI: entry; OMA: entry
Species	Human	Mouse
Entrez	64419	97287
Ensembl	ENSG00000163719	ENSMUSG00000030269
UniProt	Q8NCE2	Q8VEL2
RefSeq (mRNA)	NM_001077525; NM_001077526; NM_022485	NM_026849; NM_001362182; NM_001362183; NM_001362185
RefSeq (protein)	NP_001070993; NP_001070994; NP_071930	NP_081125; NP_001349111; NP_001349112; NP_001349114
Location (UCSC)	Chr 3: 9.65 – 9.7 Mb	Chr 6: 113.21 – 113.26 Mb
PubMed search
- Wikidata
View/Edit Human	View/Edit Mouse

Myotubularin related protein 14 also known as MTMR14 is a protein which in humans is encoded by the MTMR14 gene.

== Function ==
Expression of Mtmr14 increased with myotubule formation and differentiation. MTMR14 is a phosphatidylinositol-3-phosphatase that dephosphorylates the same substrates as myotubularin, PtdIns(3)P and PtdIns(3,5)P_{2}.

== Clinical significance ==
Mutations in the MTMR14 gene are associated with myotubular myopathy.
