= GRAM domain containing 1C =

Human gene and protein

GRAMD1C

Identifiers
- Aliases: GRAMD1C, GRAM domain containing 1C, Aster-C
- External IDs: MGI: 2443024; GeneCards: GRAMD1C

Gene location (Human)
Chr.	Chromosome 3 (human)
Band	3q13.31	Start	113,828,182 bp
Band	3q13.31	End	113,947,174 bp

Gene location (Mouse)
Chr.	Chromosome 16 (mouse)
Band	16|16 B4	Start	43,800,713 bp
Band	16|16 B4	End	43,883,708 bp
RNA expression pattern
Bgee	Human / Mouse (ortholog); Top expressed in: jejunal mucosa; bronchial epithelial cell; epithelium of nasopharynx; germinal epithelium; sperm; right uterine tube; kidney tubule; palpebral conjunctiva; body of pancreas; renal medulla / Top expressed in: olfactory epithelium; spermatocyte; otolith organ; utricle; spermatid; seminiferous tubule; zygote; primary oocyte; vestibular sensory epithelium; esophagus; More reference expression data
BioGPS	n/a
Gene ontology
Molecular function	protein binding; cholesterol binding; cholesterol transfer activity; lipid binding
Cellular component	membrane; integral component of membrane; endoplasmic reticulum membrane; plasma membrane; endoplasmic reticulum-plasma membrane contact site; endoplasmic reticulum
Biological process	cholesterol transport; cellular response to cholesterol; intermembrane sterol transfer; lipid transport
Sources:Amigo / QuickGO
Orthologs
Databases	NCBI: entry; OMA: entry
Species	Human	Mouse
Entrez	54762	207798
Ensembl	ENSG00000178075	ENSMUSG00000036292
UniProt	Q8IYS0	Q8CI52
RefSeq (mRNA)	NM_001172105; NM_017577	NM_001172107; NM_153528; NM_001359085
RefSeq (protein)	NP_001165576; NP_060047	NP_001165578; NP_705756; NP_001346014; NP_001395263; NP_001395264 NP_001395265
Location (UCSC)	Chr 3: 113.83 – 113.95 Mb	Chr 16: 43.8 – 43.88 Mb
PubMed search
- Wikidata
View/Edit Human	View/Edit Mouse

GRAM domain containing 1C also known as Aster-C is a cholesterol transport protein that is encoded by the GRAMD1C gene. It contains a transmembrane region, a GRAM domain and a VASt domain. It is anchored to the endoplasmic reticulum through its transmembrane domain.

GRAMD1C has four paralogs: GRAMD1B and GRAMD1A and two without VASt domains, GRAMD2A and GRAMD2B. Homologs of GramD proteins (Lam/Ltc proteins) are found in yeast.

The protein is expressed in the liver and testes.

== Function ==
When the plasma membrane contains high levels of cholesterol, GRAMD1c as well as GRAMD1a and GRAMD1b move to sites of contact between the plasma membrane and the endoplasmic reticulum. GRAMD1 proteins then facilitate the transport of cholesterol into the endoplasmic reticulum. Reduction of GRAMD1B and GRAMD1C suppresses the onset of a form of non-alcoholic fatty liver disease, non-alcoholic steatohepatitis (NASH) in mice. The VASt domain is responsible for binding cholesterol while the GRAM domain determines the location of the protein through sensing of cholesterol and binding partially negatively charged lipids in the plasma membrane, especially phosphatidylserine.
