= GRAM domain containing 2A =

Protein encoded by the GRAMD2A gene

GRAMD2A

Identifiers
- Aliases: GRAMD2A, GRAMD2, GRAM domain containing 2A
- External IDs: MGI: 3528937; GeneCards: GRAMD2A

Gene location (Human)
Chr.	Chromosome 15 (human)
Band	15q23	Start	72,159,806 bp
Band	15q23	End	72,197,787 bp

Gene location (Mouse)
Chr.	Chromosome 9 (mouse)
Band	9|9 B	Start	59,587,427 bp
Band	9|9 B	End	59,626,157 bp
RNA expression pattern
Bgee	Human / Mouse (ortholog); Top expressed in: tibia; placenta; right uterine tube; right lobe of thyroid gland; left lobe of thyroid gland; right lung; olfactory zone of nasal mucosa; tail of epididymis; corpus epididymis; upper lobe of left lung / Top expressed in: layer of retina; neural layer of retina; lung; placenta; granulocyte; testicle; outer nuclear layer; zone of skin; secondary oocyte; jejunum; More reference expression data
BioGPS	n/a
Gene ontology
Molecular function	phosphatidylinositol-4,5-bisphosphate binding; phosphatidylinositol binding; lipid binding
Cellular component	membrane; integral component of membrane; intrinsic component of endoplasmic reticulum membrane; extrinsic component of cytoplasmic side of plasma membrane; organelle membrane contact site; endoplasmic reticulum; endoplasmic reticulum membrane; plasma membrane
Biological process	endoplasmic reticulum-plasma membrane tethering; regulation of store-operated calcium entry
Sources:Amigo / QuickGO
Orthologs
Databases	NCBI: entry; OMA: entry
Species	Human	Mouse
Entrez	196996	546134
Ensembl	ENSG00000175318	ENSMUSG00000074259
UniProt	Q8IUY3	Q3V3G7
RefSeq (mRNA)	NM_001012642	NM_001033498; NM_001357686; NM_001379375; NM_001379376; NM_001379377
RefSeq (protein)	NP_001012660	NP_001028670; NP_001344615; NP_001366304; NP_001366305; NP_001366306
Location (UCSC)	Chr 15: 72.16 – 72.2 Mb	Chr 9: 59.59 – 59.63 Mb
PubMed search
- Wikidata
View/Edit Human	View/Edit Mouse

GRAM domain-containing 2A protein (GRAMD2A; formerly GRAMD2) is a protein encoded by the GRAMD2A gene. Like GRAMD2B, the protein consists of a GRAM domain and a transmembrane domain that anchors it to the endoplasmic reticulum.

GRAMD2A is a mammalian representative of the yeast lipid transfer proteins anchored at a membrane contact site (LAM) family. It has four paralogs: GRAMD1A, GRAMD1B, GRAMD1C and GRAMD2B. Unlike LAM and its paralogs except GRAMD2B, GRAMD2A lacks a VASt domain.

The protein localizes to sites where membranes from different organelles are in close apposition. There, it tethers the endoplasmic reticulum to the plasma membrane through its GRAM domain binding phosphatidylinositol 4,5-bisphosphate in the plasma membrane at sites enriched for the phospholipid. The protein ensures proper stromal interaction molecule 1 (STIM1) recruitment to these sites of membrane contact as part of the store-operated calcium entry pathway – a component of intracellular calcium homeostasis.
