= Muscle biopsy =

Medical exam

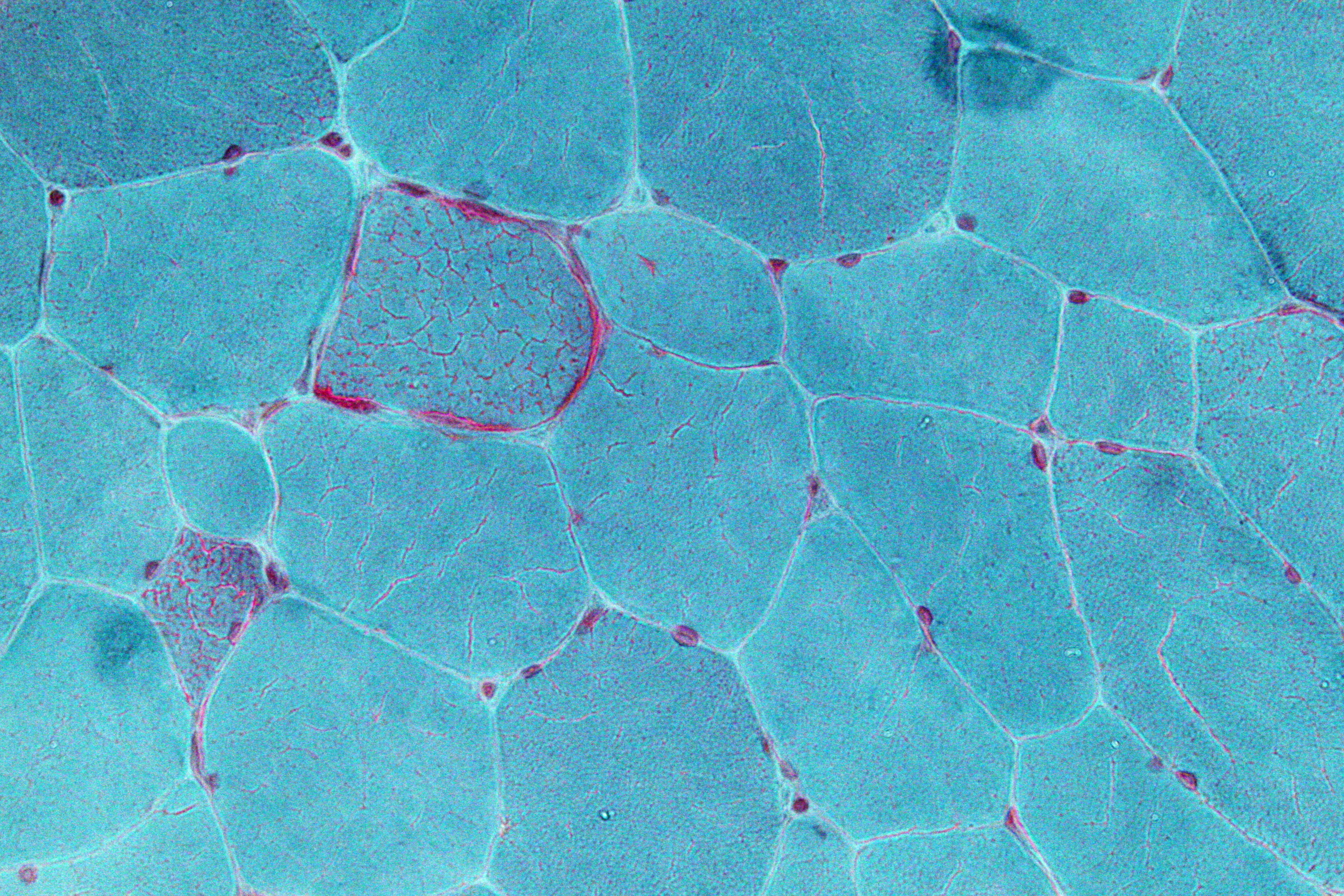
- Micrograph of a muscle biopsy showing ragged red fibers, a finding seen in various types of mitochondrial diseases. Gomori trichrome stain.
- ICD-9: 15.01

In medicine, a muscle biopsy is a procedure in which a piece of muscle tissue is removed from an organism and examined microscopically. A muscle biopsy can lead to the discovery of problems with the nervous system, connective tissue, vascular system, or musculoskeletal system.

== Indications ==
In humans with weakness and low muscle tone, a muscle biopsy can help distinguish between myopathies (where the pathology is in the muscle tissue itself) and neuropathies (where the pathology is at the nerves innervating those muscles). Muscle biopsies can also help to distinguish among various types of myopathies, by microscopic analysis for differing characteristics when exposed to a variety of chemical reactions and stains.

However, in some cases the muscle biopsy alone is inadequate to distinguish between certain myopathies. For example, a muscle biopsy showing the nucleus pathologically located in the center of the muscle cell would indicate "centronuclear myopathy", but research has shown that a variety of myopathies can cause these centronuclear biopsy appearance, and hence the specific genetic testing becomes increasingly important. Additionally muscle biopsy is the only certain way to clarify ones muscle fiber types. I.e. by undergoing a muscle biopsy one can get a clear picture of which type of muscles dominates his/her body.

== Procedure ==
A biopsy needle is usually inserted into a muscle, wherein a small amount of tissue remains. Alternatively, an "open biopsy" can be performed by obtaining the muscle tissue through a small surgical incision.

== See also ==
- Atrophy
- Necrosis (possibly of muscle fibers)
- Necrotizing vasculitis
- Muscular dystrophy
- Duchenne muscular dystrophy
- Becker's muscular dystrophy
- Myotubular myopathy
- Centronuclear myopathy
- Electromyogram
- Trichinosis
- Toxoplasmosis
- Myasthenia gravis
- Polymyositis
- Dermatomyositis
- Amyotrophic lateral sclerosis
- Friedreich's ataxia
- Hereditary inclusion body myopathy
