= SBF2 =

Protein-coding gene in the species Homo sapiens

Identifiers
- Aliases: SBF2, CMT4B2, DENND7B, MTMR13, SET binding factor 2
- External IDs: OMIM: 607697; MGI: 1921831; GeneCards: SBF2

Gene location (Human)
| Chr. | Chromosome 11 (human) |
| Band | 11p15.4 | Start | 9,776,776 bp |
| Band | 11p15.4 | End | 10,304,877 bp |

Gene location (Mouse)
| Chr. | Chromosome 7 (mouse) |
| Band | 7|7 E3 | Start | 109,907,220 bp |
| Band | 7|7 E3 | End | 110,214,129 bp |
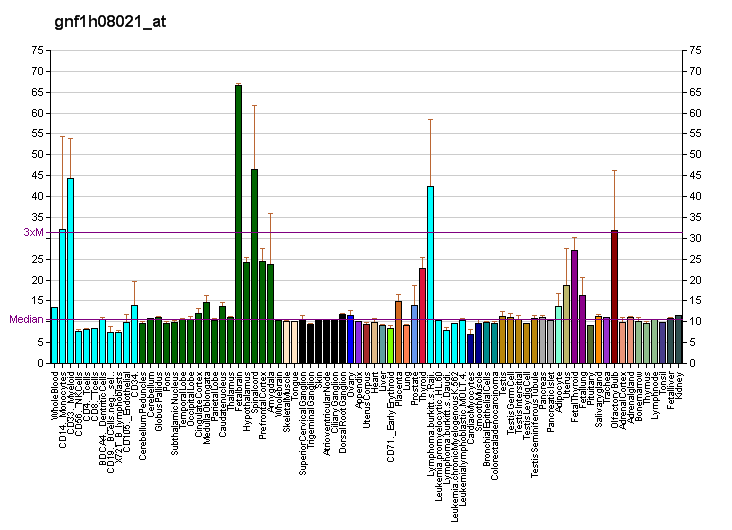
RNA expression pattern
| Bgee | Human / Mouse (ortholog); Top expressed in: pancreatic epithelial cell; epithelium of colon; Achilles tendon; sural nerve; germinal epithelium; ventricular zone; seminal vesicula; gastric mucosa; pancreatic ductal cell; subcutaneous adipose tissue / Top expressed in: Paneth cell; sciatic nerve; renal corpuscle; right ventricle; fossa; medullary collecting duct; Ileal epithelium; condyle; substantia nigra; ciliary body; More reference expression data |
| BioGPS | More reference expression data |
Gene ontology
| Molecular function | phosphatase binding; phosphatase regulator activity; protein binding; phosphatidylinositol binding; protein homodimerization activity; guanyl-nucleotide exchange factor activity |
| Cellular component | cytoplasm; membrane; vacuolar membrane; cytosol; endosome; endosome membrane; axon; cell projection; perinuclear region of cytoplasm |
| Biological process | regulation of GTPase activity; myelination; protein tetramerization; autophagy |
Sources:Amigo / QuickGO
Orthologs
| Databases | NCBI: entry; OMA: entry |
| Species | Human | Mouse |
| Entrez | 81846 | 319934 |
| Ensembl | ENSG00000133812 | ENSMUSG00000038371 |
| UniProt | Q86WG5 | E9PXF8 |
| RefSeq (mRNA) | NM_030962; NM_001386339; NM_001386342 | NM_177324; NM_178769 |
| RefSeq (protein) | NP_112224 | NP_796298; NP_001391316; NP_001391317; NP_001391318 |
| Location (UCSC) | Chr 11: 9.78 – 10.3 Mb | Chr 7: 109.91 – 110.21 Mb |
| PubMed search |
- Wikidata
| View/Edit Human | View/Edit Mouse |

Myotubularin-related protein 13 is a protein that in humans is encoded by the SBF2 gene.

The family of myotubularin-related proteins includes lipid phosphatases, such as MTM1 (MIM 600415), and pseudophosphatases, such as SBF1 (MIM 603560) and SBF2. Pseudophosphatases contain inactivating substitutions at the catalytic cysteine [supplied by OMIM].
