= GRAM domain containing 1A =

Protein that is encoded by the GRAMD1A gene

GRAMD1A

Identifiers
- Aliases: GRAMD1A, KIAA1533, GRAM domain containing 1A, Aster-A
- External IDs: MGI: 105490; GeneCards: GRAMD1A

Gene location (Human)
Chr.	Chromosome 19 (human)
Band	19q13.11	Start	34,994,784 bp
Band	19q13.11	End	35,026,471 bp

Gene location (Mouse)
Chr.	Chromosome 7 (mouse)
Band	7 B1|7 19.3 cM	Start	30,829,552 bp
Band	7 B1|7 19.3 cM	End	30,855,321 bp
RNA expression pattern
Bgee	Human / Mouse (ortholog); Top expressed in: body of pancreas; upper lobe of left lung; right uterine tube; left uterine tube; canal of the cervix; left ovary; right ovary; gastric mucosa; appendix; right lung / Top expressed in: granulocyte; thymus; lymph node; superior frontal gyrus; ganglionic eminence; muscle of thigh; visual cortex; primary visual cortex; ventricular zone; interventricular septum; More reference expression data
BioGPS	n/a
Gene ontology
Molecular function	protein binding; cholesterol binding; cholesterol transfer activity; lipid binding
Cellular component	membrane; integral component of membrane; intrinsic component of endoplasmic reticulum membrane; extrinsic component of cytoplasmic side of plasma membrane; organelle membrane contact site; endoplasmic reticulum; endoplasmic reticulum membrane; plasma membrane; endoplasmic reticulum-plasma membrane contact site
Biological process	cholesterol transport; cellular response to cholesterol; intermembrane sterol transfer; lipid transport
Sources:Amigo / QuickGO
Orthologs
Databases	NCBI: entry; OMA: entry
Species	Human	Mouse
Entrez	57655	52857
Ensembl	ENSG00000089351	ENSMUSG00000001248
UniProt	Q96CP6	Q8VEF1
RefSeq (mRNA)	NM_001136199; NM_020895; NM_001320034; NM_001320035; NM_001320036	NM_027898; NM_001360351
RefSeq (protein)	NP_001129671; NP_001306963; NP_001306964; NP_001306965; NP_065946	NP_082174; NP_001347280
Location (UCSC)	Chr 19: 34.99 – 35.03 Mb	Chr 7: 30.83 – 30.86 Mb
PubMed search
- Wikidata
View/Edit Human	View/Edit Mouse

GRAM domain containing 1A also known as Aster-A is a protein that is encoded by the GRAMD1A gene. It contains a transmembrane region, a GRAM domain and a VASt domain that can bind cholesterol. GRAMD1A has four paralogs: GRAMD1B and GRAMD1C and two without VASt domains, GRAMD2A and GRAMD2B. These proteins are mammalian representatives of the yeast lipid transfer proteins anchored at a membrane contact site (LAM) family.

The protein is expressed ubiquitously with higher levels in the central nervous system.

== Function ==
GRAMD1A localizes to the endoplasmic reticulum. Its GRAM domain tethers it to the plasma membrane where it can bind phosphatidylinositol phosphate in areas enriched for it.

When the plasma membrane contains high levels of cholesterol, GRAMD1a like GRAMD1b and GRAMD1c moves to sites of contact between the plasma membrane and the endoplasmic reticulum. The VASt domain of GRAMD1A then binds cholesterol and cholesterol is moved from the plasma membrane to the endoplasmic reticulum. The VASt domain is responsible for binding cholesterol while the GRAM domain determines the location of the protein through sensing of cholesterol and binding partially negatively charged lipids in the plasma membrane, especially phosphatidylserine.

GRAMD1A also is necessary for autophagosome biogenesis.
