= GRAM domain-containing 2B =

Protein encoded by the GRAMD2B gene

GRAMD2B

Identifiers
- Aliases: GRAMD2B, NS3TP2, GRAMD3, GRAM domain containing 3, GRAM domain containing 2B
- External IDs: MGI: 1914815; GeneCards: GRAMD2B

Gene location (Human)
Chr.	Chromosome 5 (human)
Band	5q23.2	Start	126,360,132 bp
Band	5q23.2	End	126,496,494 bp

Gene location (Mouse)
Chr.	Chromosome 18 (mouse)
Band	18|18 D3	Start	56,533,409 bp
Band	18|18 D3	End	56,636,864 bp
RNA expression pattern
Bgee	Human / Mouse (ortholog); Top expressed in: Achilles tendon; internal globus pallidus; corpus callosum; external globus pallidus; bronchial epithelial cell; decidua; dorsal motor nucleus of vagus nerve; jejunal mucosa; Epithelium of choroid plexus; caudate nucleus / Top expressed in: mucous cell of stomach; jejunum; islet of Langerhans; pyloric antrum; duodenum; epithelium of stomach; parotid gland; external carotid artery; internal carotid artery; left lobe of liver; More reference expression data
BioGPS	n/a
Orthologs
Databases	NCBI: entry; OMA: entry
Species	Human	Mouse
Entrez	65983	107022
Ensembl	ENSG00000155324	ENSMUSG00000001700
UniProt	Q96HH9	Q6PEM6
RefSeq (mRNA)	NM_001146319; NM_001146320; NM_001146321; NM_001146322; NM_023927 NM_001349541; NM_001349542; NM_001349543; NM_001349544	NM_026240; NM_001360917
RefSeq (protein)	NP_001139791; NP_001139792; NP_001139793; NP_001139794; NP_076416 NP_001336470; NP_001336471; NP_001336472; NP_001336473	NP_080516; NP_001347846
Location (UCSC)	Chr 5: 126.36 – 126.5 Mb	Chr 18: 56.53 – 56.64 Mb
PubMed search
- Wikidata
View/Edit Human	View/Edit Mouse

GRAM domain-containing 2B protein (GRAMD2B; formerly GRAMD3), also known as NS3TP2 and HCV NS3-transactivated protein 2, is a protein encoded by the GRAMD2B gene.

GRAMD2B has four paralogs: GRAMD1A, GRAMD1B, GRAMD1C and GRAMD2A. These proteins are mammalian representatives of the yeast lipid transfer proteins anchored at a membrane contact site (LAM) family.

GRAMD2B consists of a GRAM domain and a transmembrane domain anchoring it to the endoplasmic reticulum. Similar to GRAMD2A, GRAMD2B lacks the VASt domain found in LAM and GRAMD1 proteins. Its function has not yet been defined, but is likely similar to that of GRAMD2A.
