= WBP2 =

Protein-coding gene in the species Homo sapiens

Identifiers
- Aliases: WBP2, WBP-2, GRAMD6, WW domain binding protein 2, DFNB107
- External IDs: OMIM: 606962; MGI: 104709; GeneCards: WBP2

Gene location (Human)
Chr.	Chromosome 17 (human)
Band	17q25.1	Start	75,845,699 bp
Band	17q25.1	End	75,856,507 bp

Gene location (Mouse)
Chr.	Chromosome 11 (mouse)
Band	11|11 E2	Start	115,969,399 bp
Band	11|11 E2	End	115,977,821 bp
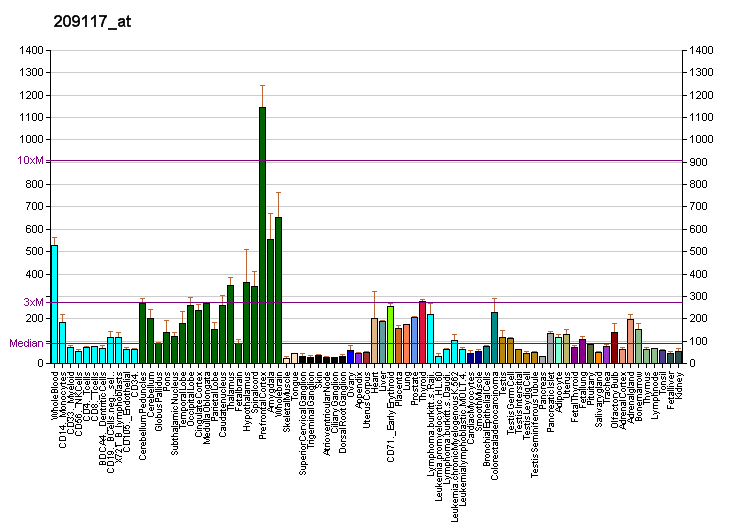
RNA expression pattern
Bgee	Human / Mouse (ortholog); Top expressed in: right frontal lobe; right hemisphere of cerebellum; prefrontal cortex; C1 segment; right adrenal gland; right adrenal cortex; left adrenal gland; left adrenal cortex; cingulate gyrus; anterior cingulate cortex / Top expressed in: primary visual cortex; neural layer of retina; dentate gyrus of hippocampal formation granule cell; superior frontal gyrus; perirhinal cortex; cerebellar cortex; entorhinal cortex; right kidney; granulocyte; CA3 field; More reference expression data
BioGPS	More reference expression data
Gene ontology
Molecular function	chromatin DNA binding; protein binding; RNA polymerase II core promoter sequence-specific DNA binding; transcription coactivator activity; estrogen receptor binding; RNA polymerase II cis-regulatory region sequence-specific DNA binding
Cellular component	nucleus; cytoplasm
Biological process	positive regulation of histone H3-K14 acetylation; positive regulation of transcription by RNA polymerase II; establishment of protein localization; epigenetic maintenance of chromatin in transcription-competent conformation; cellular response to estrogen stimulus; response to progesterone; positive regulation of intracellular estrogen receptor signaling pathway; response to estrogen; progesterone receptor signaling pathway; transcription by RNA polymerase II; positive regulation of nucleic acid-templated transcription
Sources:Amigo / QuickGO
Orthologs
Databases	NCBI: entry; OMA: entry
Species	Human	Mouse
Entrez	23558	22378
Ensembl	ENSG00000132471	ENSMUSG00000034341
UniProt	Q969T9	P97765
RefSeq (mRNA)	NM_012478; NM_001330499; NM_001348170	NM_016852; NM_001347642; NM_001361446
RefSeq (protein)	NP_001317428; NP_036610; NP_001335099	NP_001334571; NP_058548; NP_001348375
Location (UCSC)	Chr 17: 75.85 – 75.86 Mb	Chr 11: 115.97 – 115.98 Mb
PubMed search
- Wikidata
View/Edit Human	View/Edit Mouse

WW domain-binding protein 2 is a protein that in humans is encoded by the WBP2 gene.

The globular WW domain is composed of 38 to 40 semiconserved amino acids shared by proteins of diverse functions including structural, regulatory, and signaling proteins. The domain is involved in mediating protein-protein interactions through the binding of polyproline ligands. This gene encodes a WW domain binding protein, which binds to the WW domain of Yes kinase-associated protein by its PY motifs. The function of this protein has not been determined.
