= MTMR12 =

Protein-coding gene in the species Homo sapiens

Identifiers
- Aliases: MTMR12, 3-PAP, PIP3AP, myotubularin related protein 12
- External IDs: OMIM: 606501; MGI: 2443034; GeneCards: MTMR12

Gene location (Human)
Chr.	Chromosome 5 (human)
Band	5p13.3	Start	32,226,994 bp
Band	5p13.3	End	32,312,987 bp

Gene location (Mouse)
Chr.	Chromosome 15 (mouse)
Band	15|15 A1	Start	12,205,114 bp
Band	15|15 A1	End	12,274,582 bp
RNA expression pattern
Bgee	Human / Mouse (ortholog); Top expressed in: germinal epithelium; lactiferous duct; tail of epididymis; caput epididymis; endothelial cell; decidua; parietal pleura; bronchial epithelial cell; tibia; Brodmann area 23 / Top expressed in: spermatid; stroma of bone marrow; otic vesicle; granulocyte; hand; right kidney; left lung lobe; thymus; proximal tubule; otolith organ; More reference expression data
BioGPS	n/a
Gene ontology
Molecular function	protein binding; phosphatase regulator activity
Cellular component	cytosol; cytoplasm; sarcoplasmic reticulum; sarcomere
Biological process	toxin transport; regulation of catalytic activity; phosphatidylinositol biosynthetic process
Sources:Amigo / QuickGO
Orthologs
Databases	NCBI: entry; OMA: entry
Species	Human	Mouse
Entrez	54545	268783
Ensembl	ENSG00000150712	ENSMUSG00000039458
UniProt	Q9C0I1	Q80TA6
RefSeq (mRNA)	NM_001040446; NM_001294343; NM_001294344; NM_019061	NM_172958; NM_001356498
RefSeq (protein)	NP_001035536; NP_001281272; NP_001281273	NP_766546; NP_001343427
Location (UCSC)	Chr 5: 32.23 – 32.31 Mb	Chr 15: 12.21 – 12.27 Mb
PubMed search
- Wikidata
View/Edit Human	View/Edit Mouse

Myotubularin related protein 12 is a protein that in humans is encoded by the MTMR12 gene.

== Function ==
Phosphatidylinositide 3-kinase-derived membrane-anchored phosphatidylinositides, such as phosphatidylinositol 3-phosphate (PtdIns(3)P), regulate diverse cellular processes. The protein encoded by this gene functions as an adaptor subunit in a complex with an active PtdIns(3)P 3-phosphatase. Alternatively spliced transcript variants encoding different isoforms have been found for this gene.
