= MTMR9 =

Protein-coding gene in the species Homo sapiens

Identifiers
- Aliases: MTMR9, C8orf9, LIP-STYX, MTMR8, myotubularin related protein 9
- External IDs: OMIM: 606260; MGI: 2442842; GeneCards: MTMR9

Gene location (Human)
Chr.	Chromosome 8 (human)
Band	8p23.1	Start	11,284,816 bp
Band	8p23.1	End	11,328,146 bp

Gene location (Mouse)
Chr.	Chromosome 14 (mouse)
Band	14|14 D1	Start	63,757,100 bp
Band	14|14 D1	End	63,781,431 bp
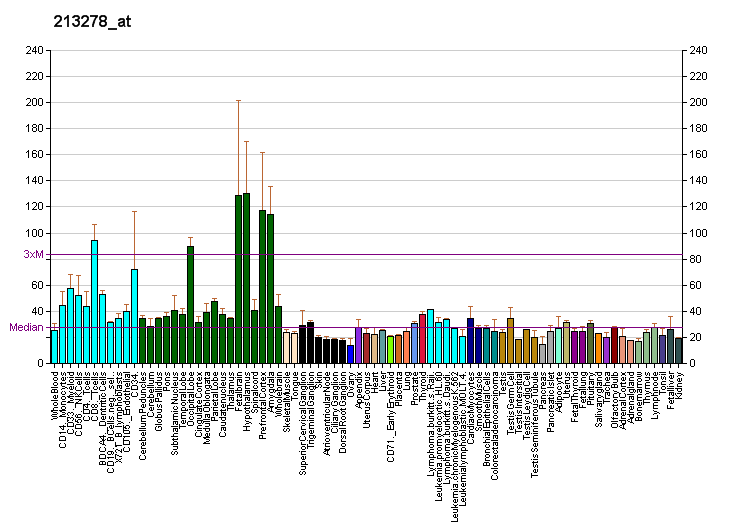

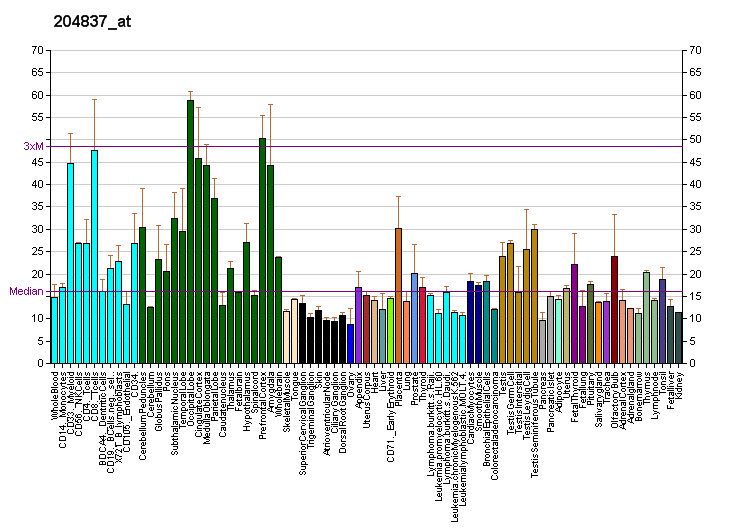
RNA expression pattern
Bgee	Human / Mouse (ortholog); Top expressed in: endothelial cell; Brodmann area 46; pars compacta; Region I of hippocampus proper; cerebellar vermis; pons; secondary oocyte; pars reticulata; Brodmann area 23; middle temporal gyrus / Top expressed in: seminiferous tubule; vestibular membrane of cochlear duct; ganglionic eminence; superior cervical ganglion; superior frontal gyrus; barrel cortex; dentate gyrus of hippocampal formation granule cell; ciliary body; retinal pigment epithelium; ventricular zone; More reference expression data
BioGPS	More reference expression data
Gene ontology
Molecular function	protein binding; enzyme regulator activity; phosphatidylinositol-3-phosphatase activity; phosphatidylinositol-3,5-bisphosphate 3-phosphatase activity; protein phosphatase binding
Cellular component	cytosol; cytoplasm; protein-containing complex; endoplasmic reticulum; plasma membrane; membrane; ruffle membrane; cell projection; perinuclear region of cytoplasm
Biological process	phosphatidylinositol biosynthetic process; dephosphorylation; negative regulation of autophagy; positive regulation of phosphatase activity; protein stabilization; regulation of phosphatidylinositol dephosphorylation; endocytosis
Sources:Amigo / QuickGO
Orthologs
Databases	NCBI: entry; OMA: entry
Species	Human	Mouse
Entrez	66036	210376
Ensembl	ENSG00000104643; ENSG00000285032	ENSMUSG00000035078
UniProt	Q96QG7	Q9Z2D0
RefSeq (mRNA)	NM_015458	NM_177594
RefSeq (protein)	NP_056273	NP_808262
Location (UCSC)	Chr 8: 11.28 – 11.33 Mb	Chr 14: 63.76 – 63.78 Mb
PubMed search
- Wikidata
View/Edit Human	View/Edit Mouse

Myotubularin-related protein 9 is a protein that in humans is encoded by the MTMR9 gene.

== Function ==
This gene encodes a myotubularin-related protein that is atypical to most other members of the myotubularin-related protein family because it has no dual-specificity phosphatase domain. The encoded protein contains a double-helical motif similar to the SET interaction domain, which is thought to have a role in the control of cell proliferation. In mouse, a protein similar to the encoded protein binds with MTMR7, and together they dephosphorylate phosphatidylinositol 3-phosphate and inositol 1,3-bisphosphate.

== Interactions ==
MTMR9 has been shown to interact with MTMR6.
