= Phosphatidylinositol-3-phosphatase =

Class of enzymes

phosphatidylinositol-3-phosphatase

Identifiers
- EC no.: 3.1.3.64
- CAS no.: 124248-47-1

Databases
- IntEnz: IntEnz view
- BRENDA: BRENDA entry
- ExPASy: NiceZyme view
- KEGG: KEGG entry
- MetaCyc: metabolic pathway
- PRIAM: profile
- PDB structures: RCSB PDB PDBe PDBsum
- Gene Ontology: AmiGO / QuickGO
Search
- PMC: articles
- PubMed: articles
- NCBI: proteins

The enzyme phosphatidylinositol-3-phosphatase (EC 3.1.3.64) catalyzes the reaction

1-phosphatidyl-1D-myo-inositol 3-phosphate + H_{2}O $\rightleftharpoons$ 1-phosphatidyl-1D-myo-inositol + phosphate

This enzyme belongs to the family of hydrolases, specifically those acting on phosphoric monoester bonds. The systematic name is 1-phosphatidyl-1D-myo-inositol-3-phosphate 3-phosphohydrolase. Other names in common use include inositol-1,3-bisphosphate 3-phosphatase, inositol 1,3-bisphosphate phosphatase, inositol-polyphosphate 3-phosphatase, D-myo-inositol-1,3-bisphosphate 3-phosphohydrolase, and phosphatidyl-3-phosphate 3-phosphohydrolase. This enzyme participates in inositol phosphate metabolism and phosphatidylinositol signaling system.

== Structural studies ==
As of late 2007, two structures have been solved for this class of enzymes, with PDB accession codes 1LW3 and 1M7R.
