= GRAMD4 =

Human gene and protein

Identifiers
- Aliases: GRAMD4, DIP, dA59H18.1, dJ439F8.1, GRAM domain containing 4
- External IDs: OMIM: 613691; MGI: 2676308; GeneCards: GRAMD4

Gene location (Human)
Chr.	Chromosome 22 (human)
Band	22q13.31	Start	46,576,012 bp
Band	22q13.31	End	46,679,790 bp

Gene location (Mouse)
Chr.	Chromosome 15 (mouse)
Band	15|15 E2	Start	85,941,896 bp
Band	15|15 E2	End	86,021,835 bp
RNA expression pattern
Bgee	Human / Mouse (ortholog); Top expressed in: mucosa of transverse colon; right lobe of liver; apex of heart; sural nerve; ventricular zone; monocyte; ganglionic eminence; left ventricle; right auricle of heart; skin of abdomen / Top expressed in: interventricular septum; pyloric antrum; epithelium of stomach; trigeminal ganglion; ventricular zone; mesenteric lymph nodes; ganglionic eminence; superior cervical ganglion; Rostral migratory stream; mucous cell of stomach; More reference expression data
BioGPS	n/a
Gene ontology
Molecular function	molecular function
Cellular component	mitochondrial membranes; integral component of membrane; membrane; mitochondrion; endoplasmic reticulum; endoplasmic reticulum membrane
Biological process	apoptotic process; positive regulation of cysteine-type endopeptidase activity involved in apoptotic process; negative regulation of toll-like receptor 9 signaling pathway
Sources:Amigo / QuickGO
Orthologs
Databases	NCBI: entry; OMA: entry
Species	Human	Mouse
Entrez	23151	223752
Ensembl	ENSG00000075240	ENSMUSG00000035900
UniProt	Q6IC98	Q8CB44
RefSeq (mRNA)	NM_015124; NM_001366660	NM_001205353; NM_172611; NM_001379572
RefSeq (protein)	NP_055939; NP_001353589	NP_001192282; NP_766199; NP_001366501
Location (UCSC)	Chr 22: 46.58 – 46.68 Mb	Chr 15: 85.94 – 86.02 Mb
PubMed search
- Wikidata
View/Edit Human	View/Edit Mouse

GRAM domain containing 4 (GRAMD4) also known as Death-Inducing Protein (DIP) is a protein that is encoded by the GRAMD4 gene.

== Function ==
GRAMD4 is a mitochondrial effector of E2F1 (MIM 189971)-induced apoptosis.
