= MTMR6 =

Protein-coding gene in the species Homo sapiens

Identifiers
- Aliases: MTMR6, myotubularin related protein 6
- External IDs: OMIM: 603561; MGI: 2145637; GeneCards: MTMR6
Available structures
PDB	Ortholog search: PDBe RCSB
PDB	List of PDB id codes 2YF0
Enzyme activity
EC #	BRENDA	ExPASy	KEGG	MetaCyc
3.1.3.95	↗	↗	↗	↗

Gene location (Human)
Chr.	Chromosome 13 (human)
Band	13q12.13	Start	25,246,201 bp
Band	13q12.13	End	25,288,009 bp

Gene location (Mouse)
Chr.	Chromosome 14 (mouse)
Band	14|14 D1	Start	60,265,228 bp
Band	14|14 D1	End	60,302,370 bp
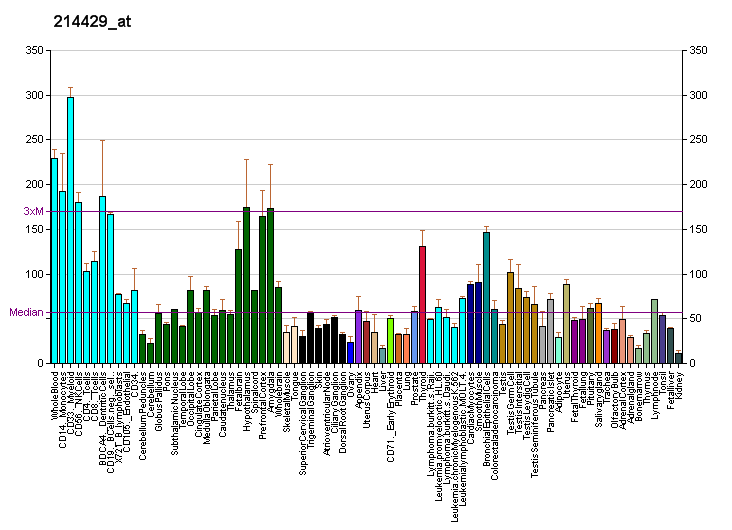
RNA expression pattern
Bgee	Human / Mouse (ortholog); Top expressed in: endothelial cell; Brodmann area 23; middle temporal gyrus; visceral pleura; palpebral conjunctiva; frontal pole; glomerulus; metanephric glomerulus; parietal pleura; sperm / Top expressed in: spermatocyte; spermatid; substantia nigra; sciatic nerve; facial motor nucleus; barrel cortex; trigeminal ganglion; superior cervical ganglion; aortic valve; iris; More reference expression data
BioGPS	More reference expression data
Gene ontology
Molecular function	protein tyrosine phosphatase activity; hydrolase activity; protein serine/threonine phosphatase activity; phosphatidylinositol phosphate phosphatase activity; calcium-activated potassium channel activity; protein binding; phosphatidylinositol-3,5-bisphosphate 3-phosphatase activity; phosphatidylinositol-3-phosphatase activity; phosphatidylinositol-3,5-bisphosphate phosphatase activity
Cellular component	cytosol; nucleus; cytoplasm; nuclear envelope; endoplasmic reticulum; endoplasmic reticulum-Golgi intermediate compartment; plasma membrane; membrane; ruffle membrane; cell projection; perinuclear region of cytoplasm
Biological process	phosphatidylinositol biosynthetic process; protein dephosphorylation; dephosphorylation; potassium ion transmembrane transport; peptidyl-tyrosine dephosphorylation; phosphatidylinositol dephosphorylation; lipid metabolism; endocytosis
Sources:Amigo / QuickGO
Orthologs
Databases	NCBI: entry; OMA: entry
Species	Human	Mouse
Entrez	9107	219135
Ensembl	ENSG00000139505	ENSMUSG00000021987
UniProt	Q9Y217	Q8VE11
RefSeq (mRNA)	NM_004685	NM_144843
RefSeq (protein)	NP_004676	NP_659092; NP_001388127; NP_001388129; NP_001388128
Location (UCSC)	Chr 13: 25.25 – 25.29 Mb	Chr 14: 60.27 – 60.3 Mb
PubMed search
- Wikidata
View/Edit Human	View/Edit Mouse

Myotubularin-related protein 6 is a protein that in humans is encoded by the MTMR6 gene.

== Interactions ==
MTMR6 has been shown to interact with MTMR9.
