= MTMR2 =

Protein-coding gene in the species Homo sapiens

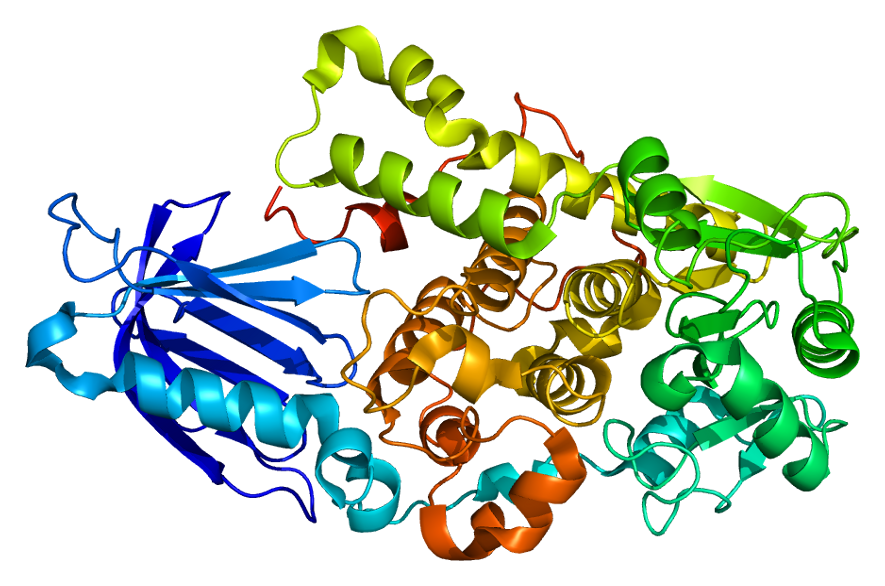

Identifiers
- Aliases: MTMR2, CMT4B, CMT4B1, myotubularin related protein 2
- External IDs: OMIM: 603557; MGI: 1924366; GeneCards: MTMR2
Available structures
PDB	Ortholog search: PDBe RCSB
PDB	List of PDB id codes 1LW3, 1M7R, 1ZSQ, 1ZVR
Enzyme activity
EC #	BRENDA	ExPASy	KEGG	MetaCyc
3.1.3.64	↗	↗	↗	↗
3.1.3.95	↗	↗	↗	↗

Gene location (Human)
Chr.	Chromosome 11 (human)
Band	11q21	Start	95,821,766 bp
Band	11q21	End	95,925,315 bp

Gene location (Mouse)
Chr.	Chromosome 9 (mouse)
Band	9|9 A1	Start	13,748,410 bp
Band	9|9 A1	End	13,806,481 bp
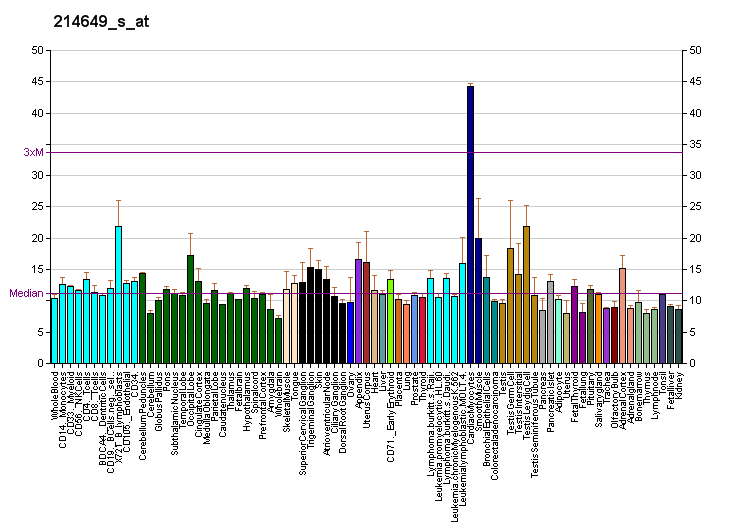

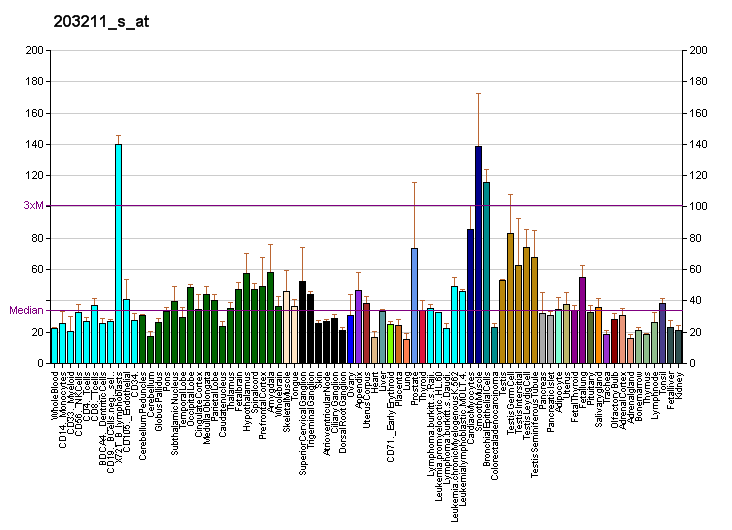

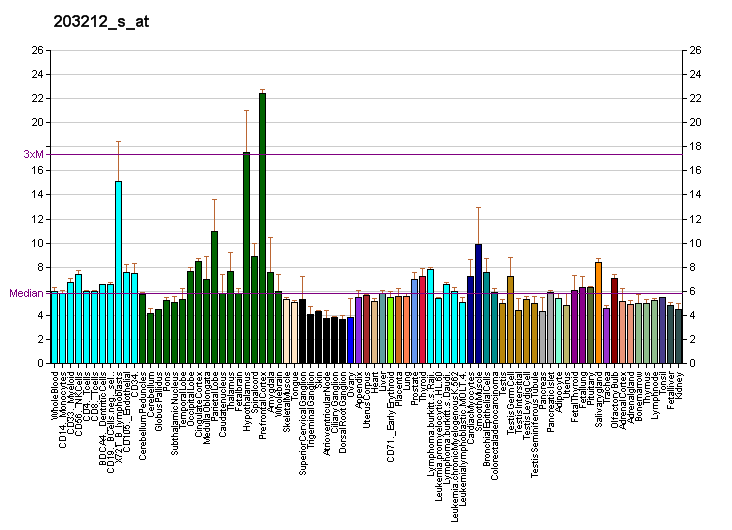
RNA expression pattern
Bgee	Human / Mouse (ortholog); Top expressed in: sperm; parotid gland; cartilage tissue; tibia; buccal mucosa cell; stromal cell of endometrium; Achilles tendon; corpus callosum; Epithelium of choroid plexus; bronchial epithelial cell / Top expressed in: spermatocyte; zygote; genital tubercle; tail of embryo; spermatid; secondary oocyte; ventricular zone; right kidney; interventricular septum; visual cortex; More reference expression data
BioGPS	More reference expression data
Gene ontology
Molecular function	protein homodimerization activity; phosphatase activity; protein binding; protein tyrosine phosphatase activity; phosphatidylinositol phosphate phosphatase activity; hydrolase activity; protein tyrosine/serine/threonine phosphatase activity; phosphatidylinositol-3-phosphatase activity; phosphatidylinositol-3,5-bisphosphate 3-phosphatase activity
Cellular component	cytoplasm; synaptic membrane; cytosol; endosome; early endosome membrane; membrane; vacuolar membrane; synaptic vesicle; dendritic spine; axon; dendrite; extracellular exosome; nucleus; postsynaptic density; intracellular membrane-bounded organelle; endosome membrane; cell projection; perinuclear region of cytoplasm
Biological process	negative regulation of endocytosis; phosphatidylinositol metabolic process; negative regulation of receptor catabolic process; myelin assembly; lipid metabolism; negative regulation of receptor internalization; protein dephosphorylation; neuron development; protein tetramerization; negative regulation of excitatory postsynaptic potential; dendritic spine maintenance; phosphatidylinositol dephosphorylation; positive regulation of early endosome to late endosome transport; phosphatidylinositol biosynthetic process; peptidyl-tyrosine dephosphorylation; negative regulation of myelination; inositol phosphate dephosphorylation; dephosphorylation; regulation of phosphatidylinositol dephosphorylation
Sources:Amigo / QuickGO
Orthologs
Databases	NCBI: entry; OMA: entry
Species	Human	Mouse
Entrez	8898	77116
Ensembl	ENSG00000087053	ENSMUSG00000031918
UniProt	Q13614	Q9Z2D1
RefSeq (mRNA)	NM_001243571; NM_016156; NM_201278; NM_201281	NM_023858; NM_001372573; NM_001373873; NM_001373874; NM_001373875 NM_001373876; NM_001373877; NM_001373878
RefSeq (protein)	NP_001230500; NP_057240; NP_958435; NP_958438	NP_076347; NP_001359502; NP_001360802; NP_001360803; NP_001360804 NP_001360805; NP_001360806; NP_001360807
Location (UCSC)	Chr 11: 95.82 – 95.93 Mb	Chr 9: 13.75 – 13.81 Mb
PubMed search
- Wikidata
View/Edit Human	View/Edit Mouse

Myotubularin-related protein 2 also known as phosphatidylinositol-3,5-bisphosphate 3-phosphatase or phosphatidylinositol-3-phosphate phosphatase is a protein that in humans is encoded by the MTMR2 gene.

== Function ==
This gene is a member of the myotubularin family and encodes a putative tyrosine phosphatase. The protein also contains a GRAM domain. Mutations in this gene are a cause of Charcot-Marie-Tooth disease type 4B, an autosomal recessive demyelinating neuropathy. Multiple alternatively spliced transcript variants have been found, but the biological validity of some variants has not been determined.

== Interactions ==
MTMR2 has been shown to interact with SBF1.
