= MTMR1 =

Protein-coding gene in the species Homo sapiens

Identifiers
- Aliases: MTMR1, myotubularin related protein 1
- External IDs: OMIM: 300171; MGI: 1858271; GeneCards: MTMR1
Available structures
PDB	Ortholog search: PDBe RCSB
PDB	List of PDB id codes 5C16
Enzyme activity
EC #	BRENDA	ExPASy	KEGG	MetaCyc
3.1.3.64	↗	↗	↗	↗
3.1.3.95	↗	↗	↗	↗

Gene location (Human)
Chr.	X chromosome (human)
Band	Xq28	Start	150,692,971 bp
Band	Xq28	End	150,765,108 bp

Gene location (Mouse)
Chr.	X chromosome (mouse)
Band	X|X A7.3	Start	70,408,366 bp
Band	X|X A7.3	End	70,462,802 bp
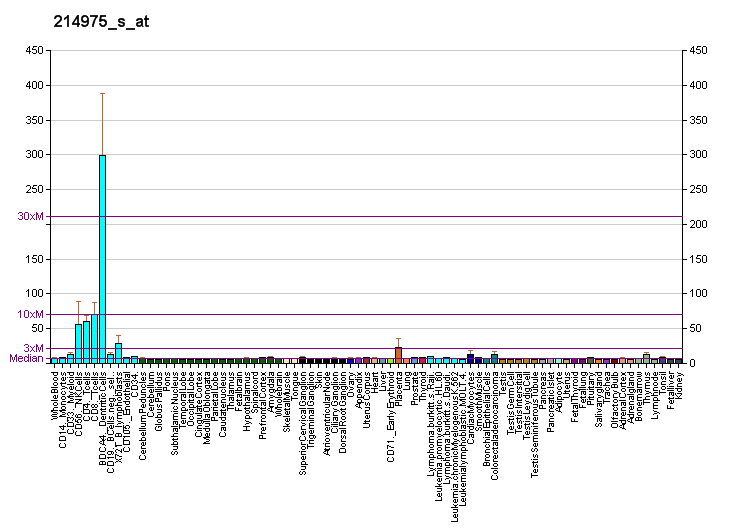

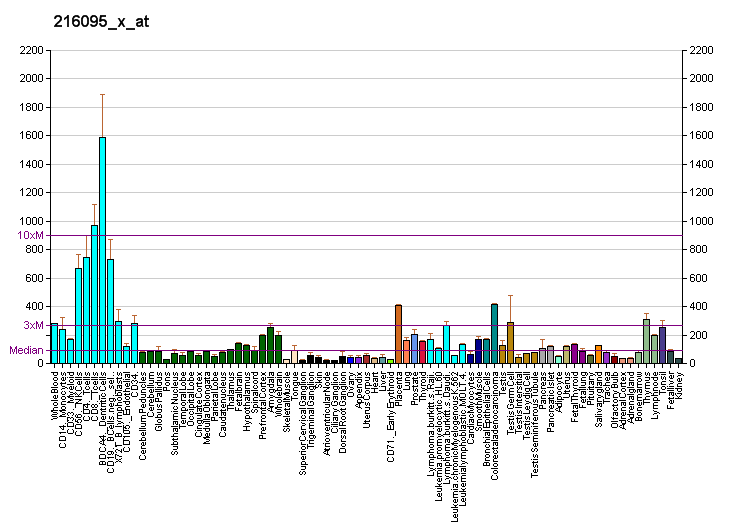

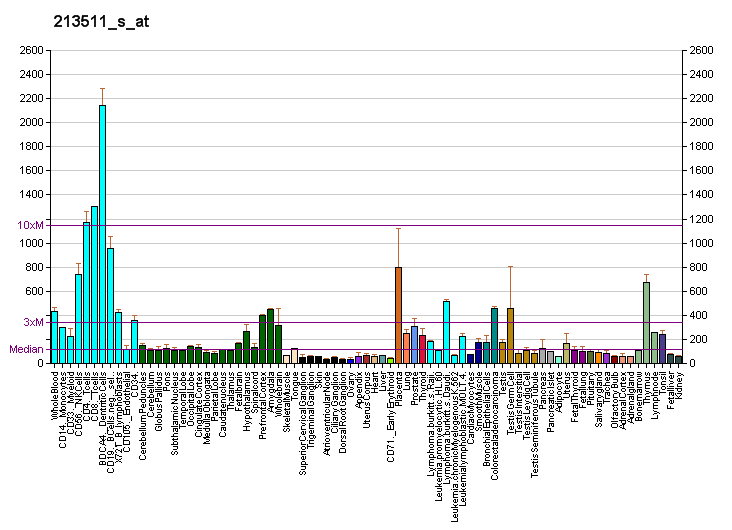
RNA expression pattern
Bgee	Human / Mouse (ortholog); Top expressed in: secondary oocyte; buccal mucosa cell; gingival epithelium; middle temporal gyrus; skin of thigh; epithelium of nasopharynx; Brodmann area 23; thymus; amniotic fluid; palpebral conjunctiva / Top expressed in: muscle of thigh; neural layer of retina; temporal muscle; triceps brachii muscle; dentate gyrus of hippocampal formation granule cell; sternocleidomastoid muscle; superior frontal gyrus; digastric muscle; primary visual cortex; esophagus; More reference expression data
BioGPS	More reference expression data
Gene ontology
Molecular function	protein tyrosine phosphatase activity; phosphatase activity; hydrolase activity; protein homodimerization activity; phosphatidylinositol-3-phosphatase activity; phosphatidylinositol-3,5-bisphosphate 3-phosphatase activity; phosphatidylinositol phosphate phosphatase activity
Cellular component	cytosol; plasma membrane; membrane; cytoplasm
Biological process	phosphatidylinositol biosynthetic process; peptidyl-tyrosine dephosphorylation; phosphatidylinositol dephosphorylation; lipid metabolism; dephosphorylation; regulation of phosphatidylinositol dephosphorylation
Sources:Amigo / QuickGO
Orthologs
Databases	NCBI: entry; OMA: entry
Species	Human	Mouse
Entrez	8776	53332
Ensembl	ENSG00000063601	ENSMUSG00000015214
UniProt	Q13613	Q9Z2C4
RefSeq (mRNA)	NM_001306144; NM_001306145; NM_003828; NM_176789; NM_001353990 NM_001353991; NM_001353992; NM_001353993; NM_001353994; NM_001353995; NM_001353996	NM_016985; NM_001313702; NM_001313703; NM_001313706; NM_001313707 NM_001313704
RefSeq (protein)	NP_001293073; NP_001293074; NP_003819; NP_001340919; NP_001340920 NP_001340921; NP_001340922; NP_001340923; NP_001340924; NP_001340925	NP_001300631; NP_001300632; NP_001300633; NP_001300635; NP_001300636 NP_058681
Location (UCSC)	Chr X: 150.69 – 150.77 Mb	Chr X: 70.41 – 70.46 Mb
PubMed search
- Wikidata
View/Edit Human	View/Edit Mouse

Myotubularin-related protein 1 is a protein that in humans is encoded by the MTMR1 gene.

This gene encodes a member of the myotubularin related family of proteins. Members of this family contain the consensus sequence for the active site of protein tyrosine phosphatases. Alternatively spliced variants have been described but their biological validity has not been determined.
