= SBF1 =

Protein-coding gene in the species Homo sapiens

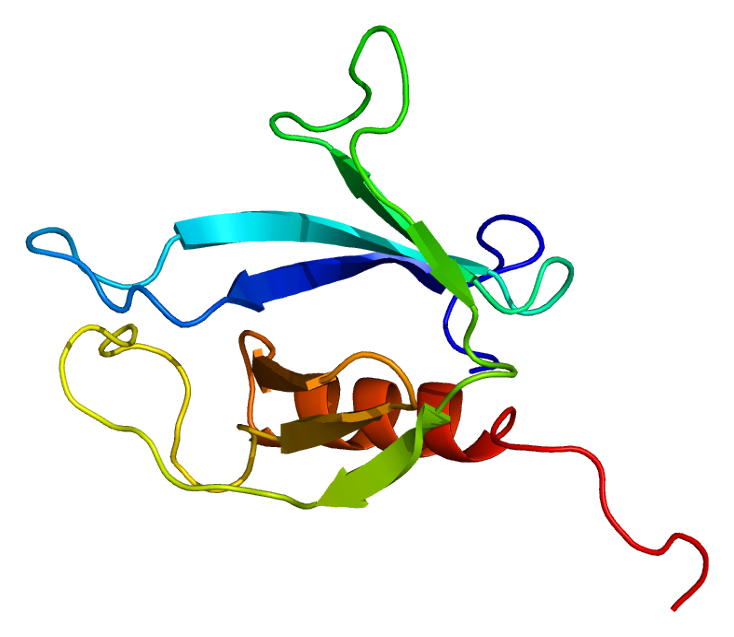

Identifiers
- Aliases: SBF1, CMT4B3, DENND7A, MTMR5, SET binding factor 1
- External IDs: OMIM: 603560; MGI: 1925230; GeneCards: SBF1
Available structures
PDB	Ortholog search: PDBe RCSB
PDB	List of PDB id codes 1V5U

Gene location (Human)
Chr.	Chromosome 22 (human)
Band	22q13.33	Start	50,443,219 bp
Band	22q13.33	End	50,483,923 bp

Gene location (Mouse)
Chr.	Chromosome 15 (mouse)
Band	15|15 E3	Start	89,172,439 bp
Band	15|15 E3	End	89,199,514 bp
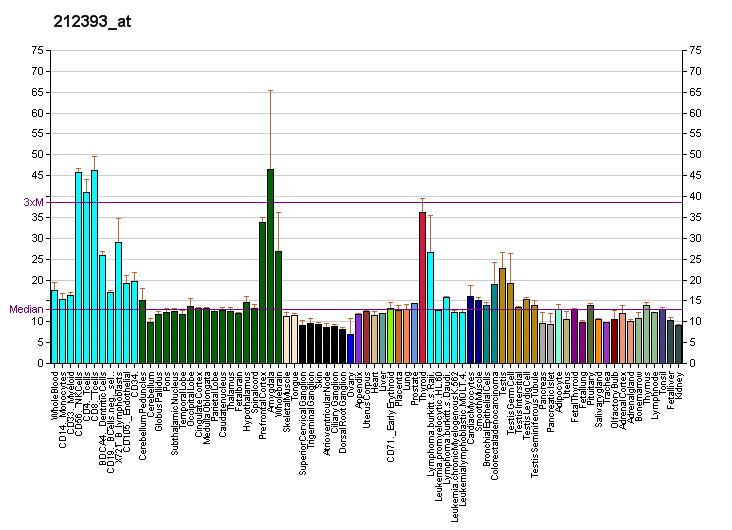

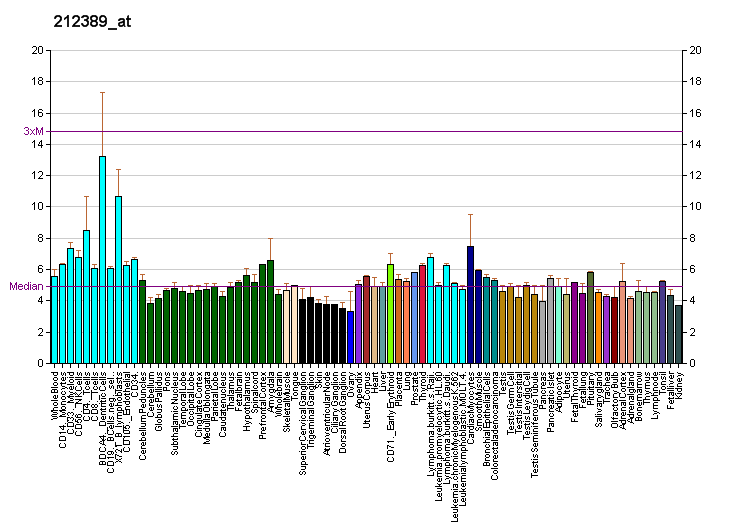

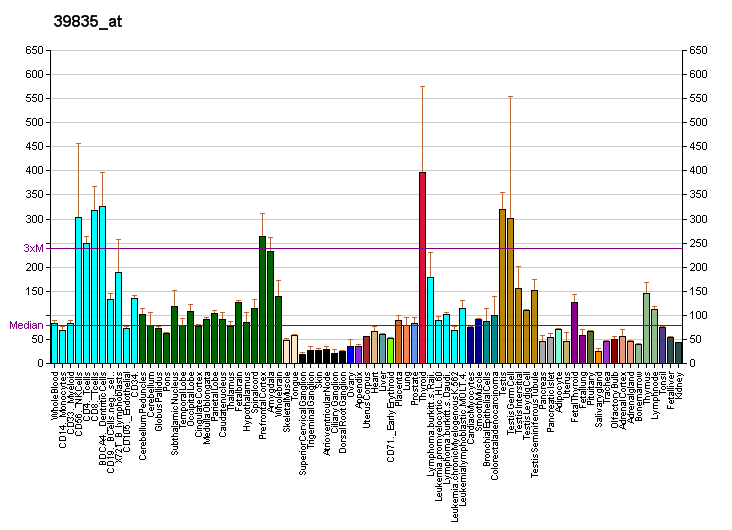
RNA expression pattern
Bgee	Human / Mouse (ortholog); Top expressed in: left testis; right testis; right lobe of thyroid gland; left lobe of thyroid gland; right hemisphere of cerebellum; right frontal lobe; cingulate gyrus; C1 segment; anterior cingulate cortex; amygdala / Top expressed in: dentate gyrus of hippocampal formation granule cell; neural layer of retina; spermatocyte; superior frontal gyrus; ventricular zone; primary visual cortex; thymus; granulocyte; lip; esophagus; More reference expression data
BioGPS	More reference expression data
Gene ontology
Molecular function	phosphatase regulator activity; protein tyrosine/serine/threonine phosphatase activity; guanyl-nucleotide exchange factor activity; phosphatase activity
Cellular component	integral component of membrane; nucleus; cytosol; endoplasmic reticulum membrane; cytoplasm; nuclear body; perinuclear region of cytoplasm
Biological process	regulation of GTPase activity; protein dephosphorylation; spermatogenesis; phosphatidylinositol biosynthetic process
Sources:Amigo / QuickGO
Orthologs
Databases	NCBI: entry; OMA: entry
Species	Human	Mouse
Entrez	6305	77980
Ensembl	ENSG00000100241	ENSMUSG00000036529
UniProt	O95248	Q6ZPE2
RefSeq (mRNA)	NM_002972; NM_001365819	NM_001081030; NM_001170561; NM_030019
RefSeq (protein)	NP_002963; NP_001352748	NP_001074499; NP_001164032
Location (UCSC)	Chr 22: 50.44 – 50.48 Mb	Chr 15: 89.17 – 89.2 Mb
PubMed search
- Wikidata
View/Edit Human	View/Edit Mouse

Myotubularin-related protein 5 is a protein that in humans is encoded by the SBF1 gene.

== Interactions ==
SBF1 has been shown to interact with MTMR2 and SUV39H1.
